

268001–268100 

|-bgcolor=#fefefe
| 268001 ||  || — || May 9, 2004 || Kitt Peak || Spacewatch || — || align=right | 1.2 km || 
|-id=002 bgcolor=#fefefe
| 268002 ||  || — || May 10, 2004 || Palomar || NEAT || FLO || align=right | 1.1 km || 
|-id=003 bgcolor=#fefefe
| 268003 ||  || — || May 13, 2004 || Palomar || NEAT || — || align=right | 1.2 km || 
|-id=004 bgcolor=#fefefe
| 268004 ||  || — || May 15, 2004 || Socorro || LINEAR || — || align=right | 1.1 km || 
|-id=005 bgcolor=#fefefe
| 268005 ||  || — || May 13, 2004 || Anderson Mesa || LONEOS || NYS || align=right data-sort-value="0.90" | 900 m || 
|-id=006 bgcolor=#fefefe
| 268006 ||  || — || May 15, 2004 || Socorro || LINEAR || — || align=right | 1.2 km || 
|-id=007 bgcolor=#fefefe
| 268007 ||  || — || May 15, 2004 || Socorro || LINEAR || — || align=right | 1.1 km || 
|-id=008 bgcolor=#fefefe
| 268008 ||  || — || May 15, 2004 || Socorro || LINEAR || — || align=right | 1.0 km || 
|-id=009 bgcolor=#fefefe
| 268009 ||  || — || May 13, 2004 || Anderson Mesa || LONEOS || V || align=right data-sort-value="0.89" | 890 m || 
|-id=010 bgcolor=#fefefe
| 268010 ||  || — || May 16, 2004 || Siding Spring || SSS || MAS || align=right data-sort-value="0.94" | 940 m || 
|-id=011 bgcolor=#fefefe
| 268011 ||  || — || May 17, 2004 || Socorro || LINEAR || NYS || align=right data-sort-value="0.74" | 740 m || 
|-id=012 bgcolor=#fefefe
| 268012 ||  || — || June 6, 2004 || Palomar || NEAT || NYS || align=right data-sort-value="0.76" | 760 m || 
|-id=013 bgcolor=#E9E9E9
| 268013 ||  || — || June 24, 2004 || Campo Imperatore || CINEOS || — || align=right | 1.6 km || 
|-id=014 bgcolor=#E9E9E9
| 268014 ||  || — || July 6, 2004 || Campo Imperatore || CINEOS || — || align=right | 1.4 km || 
|-id=015 bgcolor=#E9E9E9
| 268015 ||  || — || July 14, 2004 || Socorro || LINEAR || — || align=right | 2.6 km || 
|-id=016 bgcolor=#E9E9E9
| 268016 ||  || — || July 11, 2004 || Socorro || LINEAR || — || align=right | 1.2 km || 
|-id=017 bgcolor=#fefefe
| 268017 ||  || — || July 9, 2004 || Socorro || LINEAR || NYS || align=right data-sort-value="0.94" | 940 m || 
|-id=018 bgcolor=#E9E9E9
| 268018 ||  || — || July 11, 2004 || Socorro || LINEAR || — || align=right | 1.3 km || 
|-id=019 bgcolor=#fefefe
| 268019 ||  || — || July 11, 2004 || Socorro || LINEAR || H || align=right data-sort-value="0.83" | 830 m || 
|-id=020 bgcolor=#E9E9E9
| 268020 ||  || — || July 15, 2004 || Socorro || LINEAR || JUN || align=right | 1.6 km || 
|-id=021 bgcolor=#E9E9E9
| 268021 ||  || — || July 15, 2004 || Socorro || LINEAR || EUN || align=right | 1.9 km || 
|-id=022 bgcolor=#E9E9E9
| 268022 ||  || — || July 11, 2004 || Socorro || LINEAR || — || align=right | 3.2 km || 
|-id=023 bgcolor=#fefefe
| 268023 ||  || — || July 11, 2004 || Socorro || LINEAR || — || align=right | 1.5 km || 
|-id=024 bgcolor=#fefefe
| 268024 ||  || — || July 9, 2004 || Anderson Mesa || LONEOS || NYS || align=right | 1.1 km || 
|-id=025 bgcolor=#fefefe
| 268025 ||  || — || July 15, 2004 || Socorro || LINEAR || H || align=right data-sort-value="0.84" | 840 m || 
|-id=026 bgcolor=#fefefe
| 268026 ||  || — || July 12, 2004 || Palomar || NEAT || H || align=right data-sort-value="0.92" | 920 m || 
|-id=027 bgcolor=#E9E9E9
| 268027 ||  || — || July 16, 2004 || Socorro || LINEAR || — || align=right | 1.3 km || 
|-id=028 bgcolor=#E9E9E9
| 268028 ||  || — || July 25, 2004 || Anderson Mesa || LONEOS || BAR || align=right | 2.0 km || 
|-id=029 bgcolor=#E9E9E9
| 268029 ||  || — || August 6, 2004 || Palomar || NEAT || — || align=right | 1.9 km || 
|-id=030 bgcolor=#E9E9E9
| 268030 ||  || — || August 6, 2004 || Palomar || NEAT || — || align=right | 1.8 km || 
|-id=031 bgcolor=#fefefe
| 268031 ||  || — || August 7, 2004 || Palomar || NEAT || — || align=right | 1.3 km || 
|-id=032 bgcolor=#E9E9E9
| 268032 ||  || — || August 7, 2004 || Palomar || NEAT || — || align=right | 2.6 km || 
|-id=033 bgcolor=#E9E9E9
| 268033 ||  || — || August 8, 2004 || Anderson Mesa || LONEOS || ADE || align=right | 3.3 km || 
|-id=034 bgcolor=#E9E9E9
| 268034 ||  || — || August 9, 2004 || Socorro || LINEAR || — || align=right | 3.2 km || 
|-id=035 bgcolor=#E9E9E9
| 268035 ||  || — || August 9, 2004 || Socorro || LINEAR || — || align=right | 1.8 km || 
|-id=036 bgcolor=#E9E9E9
| 268036 ||  || — || August 7, 2004 || Campo Imperatore || CINEOS || ADE || align=right | 3.8 km || 
|-id=037 bgcolor=#fefefe
| 268037 ||  || — || August 8, 2004 || Anderson Mesa || LONEOS || H || align=right data-sort-value="0.90" | 900 m || 
|-id=038 bgcolor=#E9E9E9
| 268038 ||  || — || August 8, 2004 || Anderson Mesa || LONEOS || — || align=right | 3.0 km || 
|-id=039 bgcolor=#E9E9E9
| 268039 ||  || — || August 11, 2004 || Socorro || LINEAR || — || align=right | 1.6 km || 
|-id=040 bgcolor=#E9E9E9
| 268040 ||  || — || August 10, 2004 || Socorro || LINEAR || — || align=right | 1.4 km || 
|-id=041 bgcolor=#E9E9E9
| 268041 ||  || — || August 15, 2004 || Siding Spring || SSS || — || align=right | 2.0 km || 
|-id=042 bgcolor=#E9E9E9
| 268042 ||  || — || August 16, 2004 || Palomar || NEAT || — || align=right | 1.9 km || 
|-id=043 bgcolor=#E9E9E9
| 268043 ||  || — || August 17, 2004 || Socorro || LINEAR || — || align=right | 2.5 km || 
|-id=044 bgcolor=#fefefe
| 268044 ||  || — || August 21, 2004 || Siding Spring || SSS || H || align=right data-sort-value="0.97" | 970 m || 
|-id=045 bgcolor=#E9E9E9
| 268045 ||  || — || August 21, 2004 || Siding Spring || SSS || — || align=right | 2.2 km || 
|-id=046 bgcolor=#E9E9E9
| 268046 ||  || — || August 21, 2004 || Siding Spring || SSS || — || align=right | 1.5 km || 
|-id=047 bgcolor=#E9E9E9
| 268047 ||  || — || August 23, 2004 || Kitt Peak || Spacewatch || — || align=right | 1.3 km || 
|-id=048 bgcolor=#E9E9E9
| 268048 ||  || — || August 26, 2004 || Catalina || CSS || — || align=right | 4.5 km || 
|-id=049 bgcolor=#E9E9E9
| 268049 ||  || — || August 26, 2004 || Goodricke-Pigott || R. A. Tucker || BRU || align=right | 4.8 km || 
|-id=050 bgcolor=#E9E9E9
| 268050 ||  || — || August 24, 2004 || Siding Spring || SSS || — || align=right | 4.4 km || 
|-id=051 bgcolor=#d6d6d6
| 268051 ||  || — || August 21, 2004 || Siding Spring || SSS || — || align=right | 3.8 km || 
|-id=052 bgcolor=#E9E9E9
| 268052 || 2004 RH || — || September 2, 2004 || Kleť || Kleť Obs. || AGN || align=right | 1.6 km || 
|-id=053 bgcolor=#E9E9E9
| 268053 ||  || — || September 5, 2004 || Kleť || Kleť Obs. || HEN || align=right | 1.2 km || 
|-id=054 bgcolor=#E9E9E9
| 268054 ||  || — || September 7, 2004 || Kitt Peak || Spacewatch || — || align=right | 1.2 km || 
|-id=055 bgcolor=#E9E9E9
| 268055 ||  || — || September 7, 2004 || Kitt Peak || Spacewatch || — || align=right | 3.6 km || 
|-id=056 bgcolor=#E9E9E9
| 268056 ||  || — || September 7, 2004 || Kitt Peak || Spacewatch || — || align=right | 1.4 km || 
|-id=057 bgcolor=#E9E9E9
| 268057 Michaelkaschke ||  ||  || September 8, 2004 || Kleť || KLENOT || HOF || align=right | 4.1 km || 
|-id=058 bgcolor=#fefefe
| 268058 ||  || — || September 7, 2004 || Socorro || LINEAR || — || align=right | 1.3 km || 
|-id=059 bgcolor=#E9E9E9
| 268059 ||  || — || September 7, 2004 || Socorro || LINEAR || NEM || align=right | 3.6 km || 
|-id=060 bgcolor=#E9E9E9
| 268060 ||  || — || September 8, 2004 || Socorro || LINEAR || MAR || align=right | 1.5 km || 
|-id=061 bgcolor=#d6d6d6
| 268061 ||  || — || September 8, 2004 || Socorro || LINEAR || — || align=right | 2.8 km || 
|-id=062 bgcolor=#E9E9E9
| 268062 ||  || — || September 8, 2004 || Socorro || LINEAR || — || align=right | 2.3 km || 
|-id=063 bgcolor=#E9E9E9
| 268063 ||  || — || September 8, 2004 || Socorro || LINEAR || MIS || align=right | 3.3 km || 
|-id=064 bgcolor=#E9E9E9
| 268064 ||  || — || September 8, 2004 || Socorro || LINEAR || — || align=right | 4.4 km || 
|-id=065 bgcolor=#E9E9E9
| 268065 ||  || — || September 8, 2004 || Socorro || LINEAR || — || align=right | 2.6 km || 
|-id=066 bgcolor=#E9E9E9
| 268066 ||  || — || September 8, 2004 || Socorro || LINEAR || EUN || align=right | 2.1 km || 
|-id=067 bgcolor=#E9E9E9
| 268067 ||  || — || September 8, 2004 || Socorro || LINEAR || — || align=right | 2.8 km || 
|-id=068 bgcolor=#fefefe
| 268068 ||  || — || September 8, 2004 || Socorro || LINEAR || — || align=right | 1.2 km || 
|-id=069 bgcolor=#E9E9E9
| 268069 ||  || — || September 8, 2004 || Socorro || LINEAR || — || align=right | 2.6 km || 
|-id=070 bgcolor=#E9E9E9
| 268070 ||  || — || September 8, 2004 || Socorro || LINEAR || — || align=right | 2.1 km || 
|-id=071 bgcolor=#E9E9E9
| 268071 ||  || — || September 8, 2004 || Socorro || LINEAR || — || align=right | 2.6 km || 
|-id=072 bgcolor=#E9E9E9
| 268072 ||  || — || September 8, 2004 || Socorro || LINEAR || — || align=right | 1.8 km || 
|-id=073 bgcolor=#E9E9E9
| 268073 ||  || — || September 8, 2004 || Socorro || LINEAR || — || align=right | 3.1 km || 
|-id=074 bgcolor=#E9E9E9
| 268074 ||  || — || September 8, 2004 || Socorro || LINEAR || — || align=right | 2.2 km || 
|-id=075 bgcolor=#E9E9E9
| 268075 ||  || — || September 6, 2004 || Siding Spring || SSS || — || align=right | 1.7 km || 
|-id=076 bgcolor=#fefefe
| 268076 ||  || — || September 8, 2004 || Socorro || LINEAR || H || align=right | 1.1 km || 
|-id=077 bgcolor=#E9E9E9
| 268077 ||  || — || September 8, 2004 || Palomar || NEAT || RAF || align=right | 1.4 km || 
|-id=078 bgcolor=#E9E9E9
| 268078 ||  || — || September 9, 2004 || Kitt Peak || Spacewatch || GEF || align=right | 1.4 km || 
|-id=079 bgcolor=#fefefe
| 268079 ||  || — || September 11, 2004 || Socorro || LINEAR || H || align=right data-sort-value="0.97" | 970 m || 
|-id=080 bgcolor=#E9E9E9
| 268080 ||  || — || September 7, 2004 || Kitt Peak || Spacewatch || AST || align=right | 2.7 km || 
|-id=081 bgcolor=#E9E9E9
| 268081 ||  || — || September 7, 2004 || Kitt Peak || Spacewatch || HEN || align=right | 1.0 km || 
|-id=082 bgcolor=#d6d6d6
| 268082 ||  || — || September 8, 2004 || Socorro || LINEAR || — || align=right | 2.4 km || 
|-id=083 bgcolor=#E9E9E9
| 268083 ||  || — || September 9, 2004 || Socorro || LINEAR || — || align=right | 1.5 km || 
|-id=084 bgcolor=#E9E9E9
| 268084 ||  || — || September 9, 2004 || Socorro || LINEAR || — || align=right | 2.0 km || 
|-id=085 bgcolor=#E9E9E9
| 268085 ||  || — || September 9, 2004 || Socorro || LINEAR || — || align=right | 2.2 km || 
|-id=086 bgcolor=#E9E9E9
| 268086 ||  || — || September 10, 2004 || Socorro || LINEAR || EUN || align=right | 1.8 km || 
|-id=087 bgcolor=#E9E9E9
| 268087 ||  || — || September 10, 2004 || Socorro || LINEAR || MRX || align=right | 1.1 km || 
|-id=088 bgcolor=#d6d6d6
| 268088 ||  || — || September 10, 2004 || Socorro || LINEAR || BRA || align=right | 2.3 km || 
|-id=089 bgcolor=#d6d6d6
| 268089 ||  || — || September 11, 2004 || Socorro || LINEAR || — || align=right | 4.2 km || 
|-id=090 bgcolor=#E9E9E9
| 268090 ||  || — || September 9, 2004 || Kitt Peak || Spacewatch || WIT || align=right | 1.3 km || 
|-id=091 bgcolor=#E9E9E9
| 268091 ||  || — || September 9, 2004 || Kitt Peak || Spacewatch || — || align=right | 1.5 km || 
|-id=092 bgcolor=#E9E9E9
| 268092 ||  || — || September 9, 2004 || Kitt Peak || Spacewatch || HOF || align=right | 3.0 km || 
|-id=093 bgcolor=#E9E9E9
| 268093 ||  || — || September 7, 2004 || Socorro || LINEAR || HNS || align=right | 1.6 km || 
|-id=094 bgcolor=#E9E9E9
| 268094 ||  || — || September 9, 2004 || Socorro || LINEAR || — || align=right | 1.6 km || 
|-id=095 bgcolor=#E9E9E9
| 268095 ||  || — || September 9, 2004 || Apache Point || Apache Point Obs. || — || align=right | 3.6 km || 
|-id=096 bgcolor=#E9E9E9
| 268096 ||  || — || September 10, 2004 || Socorro || LINEAR || EUN || align=right | 1.9 km || 
|-id=097 bgcolor=#E9E9E9
| 268097 ||  || — || September 10, 2004 || Kitt Peak || Spacewatch || — || align=right | 2.3 km || 
|-id=098 bgcolor=#d6d6d6
| 268098 ||  || — || September 15, 2004 || Socorro || LINEAR || EUP || align=right | 5.2 km || 
|-id=099 bgcolor=#E9E9E9
| 268099 ||  || — || September 13, 2004 || Socorro || LINEAR || — || align=right | 2.7 km || 
|-id=100 bgcolor=#E9E9E9
| 268100 ||  || — || September 13, 2004 || Palomar || NEAT || PAD || align=right | 2.9 km || 
|}

268101–268200 

|-bgcolor=#E9E9E9
| 268101 ||  || — || September 13, 2004 || Socorro || LINEAR || — || align=right | 3.0 km || 
|-id=102 bgcolor=#E9E9E9
| 268102 ||  || — || September 15, 2004 || Kitt Peak || Spacewatch || AGN || align=right | 1.3 km || 
|-id=103 bgcolor=#E9E9E9
| 268103 ||  || — || September 9, 2004 || Socorro || LINEAR || — || align=right | 2.9 km || 
|-id=104 bgcolor=#E9E9E9
| 268104 ||  || — || September 8, 2004 || Palomar || NEAT || — || align=right | 3.7 km || 
|-id=105 bgcolor=#E9E9E9
| 268105 ||  || — || September 11, 2004 || Kitt Peak || Spacewatch || NEM || align=right | 2.3 km || 
|-id=106 bgcolor=#E9E9E9
| 268106 ||  || — || September 17, 2004 || Kitt Peak || Spacewatch || EUN || align=right | 1.7 km || 
|-id=107 bgcolor=#E9E9E9
| 268107 ||  || — || September 16, 2004 || Siding Spring || SSS || GEF || align=right | 2.1 km || 
|-id=108 bgcolor=#E9E9E9
| 268108 ||  || — || September 17, 2004 || Kitt Peak || Spacewatch || — || align=right | 2.9 km || 
|-id=109 bgcolor=#E9E9E9
| 268109 ||  || — || September 16, 2004 || Kitt Peak || Spacewatch || — || align=right | 2.0 km || 
|-id=110 bgcolor=#d6d6d6
| 268110 ||  || — || September 22, 2004 || Socorro || LINEAR || — || align=right | 5.5 km || 
|-id=111 bgcolor=#E9E9E9
| 268111 ||  || — || September 16, 2004 || Anderson Mesa || LONEOS || — || align=right | 3.7 km || 
|-id=112 bgcolor=#E9E9E9
| 268112 ||  || — || September 17, 2004 || Bergisch Gladbach || W. Bickel || — || align=right | 2.7 km || 
|-id=113 bgcolor=#E9E9E9
| 268113 ||  || — || October 3, 2004 || Goodricke-Pigott || R. A. Tucker || HOF || align=right | 3.7 km || 
|-id=114 bgcolor=#fefefe
| 268114 ||  || — || October 5, 2004 || Anderson Mesa || LONEOS || H || align=right data-sort-value="0.79" | 790 m || 
|-id=115 bgcolor=#E9E9E9
| 268115 Williamalbrecht ||  ||  || October 7, 2004 || Sonoita || W. R. Cooney Jr., J. Gross || BRU || align=right | 2.5 km || 
|-id=116 bgcolor=#E9E9E9
| 268116 ||  || — || October 6, 2004 || Palomar || NEAT || EUN || align=right | 1.5 km || 
|-id=117 bgcolor=#E9E9E9
| 268117 ||  || — || October 4, 2004 || Apache Point || J. C. Barentine, G. A. Esquerdo || — || align=right | 2.9 km || 
|-id=118 bgcolor=#E9E9E9
| 268118 ||  || — || October 4, 2004 || Kitt Peak || Spacewatch || — || align=right | 2.0 km || 
|-id=119 bgcolor=#d6d6d6
| 268119 ||  || — || October 4, 2004 || Kitt Peak || Spacewatch || — || align=right | 2.5 km || 
|-id=120 bgcolor=#E9E9E9
| 268120 ||  || — || October 4, 2004 || Kitt Peak || Spacewatch || — || align=right | 3.4 km || 
|-id=121 bgcolor=#E9E9E9
| 268121 ||  || — || October 4, 2004 || Kitt Peak || Spacewatch || — || align=right | 2.3 km || 
|-id=122 bgcolor=#E9E9E9
| 268122 ||  || — || October 4, 2004 || Kitt Peak || Spacewatch || — || align=right | 3.2 km || 
|-id=123 bgcolor=#E9E9E9
| 268123 ||  || — || October 5, 2004 || Kitt Peak || Spacewatch || AGN || align=right | 1.7 km || 
|-id=124 bgcolor=#d6d6d6
| 268124 ||  || — || October 5, 2004 || Anderson Mesa || LONEOS || — || align=right | 3.1 km || 
|-id=125 bgcolor=#E9E9E9
| 268125 ||  || — || October 5, 2004 || Kitt Peak || Spacewatch || XIZ || align=right | 1.5 km || 
|-id=126 bgcolor=#E9E9E9
| 268126 ||  || — || October 5, 2004 || Kitt Peak || Spacewatch || HOF || align=right | 2.8 km || 
|-id=127 bgcolor=#d6d6d6
| 268127 ||  || — || October 5, 2004 || Kitt Peak || Spacewatch || KOR || align=right | 1.4 km || 
|-id=128 bgcolor=#d6d6d6
| 268128 ||  || — || October 5, 2004 || Kitt Peak || Spacewatch || — || align=right | 2.4 km || 
|-id=129 bgcolor=#d6d6d6
| 268129 ||  || — || October 5, 2004 || Kitt Peak || Spacewatch || KOR || align=right | 1.4 km || 
|-id=130 bgcolor=#E9E9E9
| 268130 ||  || — || October 7, 2004 || Socorro || LINEAR || — || align=right | 3.0 km || 
|-id=131 bgcolor=#d6d6d6
| 268131 ||  || — || October 5, 2004 || Anderson Mesa || LONEOS || — || align=right | 4.9 km || 
|-id=132 bgcolor=#d6d6d6
| 268132 ||  || — || October 5, 2004 || Palomar || NEAT || — || align=right | 2.2 km || 
|-id=133 bgcolor=#d6d6d6
| 268133 ||  || — || October 7, 2004 || Anderson Mesa || LONEOS || — || align=right | 2.9 km || 
|-id=134 bgcolor=#E9E9E9
| 268134 ||  || — || October 7, 2004 || Socorro || LINEAR || — || align=right | 2.4 km || 
|-id=135 bgcolor=#d6d6d6
| 268135 ||  || — || October 6, 2004 || Kitt Peak || Spacewatch || CHA || align=right | 2.2 km || 
|-id=136 bgcolor=#d6d6d6
| 268136 ||  || — || October 6, 2004 || Kitt Peak || Spacewatch || K-2 || align=right | 1.4 km || 
|-id=137 bgcolor=#E9E9E9
| 268137 ||  || — || October 6, 2004 || Kitt Peak || Spacewatch || — || align=right | 2.2 km || 
|-id=138 bgcolor=#E9E9E9
| 268138 ||  || — || October 6, 2004 || Kitt Peak || Spacewatch || PAD || align=right | 3.1 km || 
|-id=139 bgcolor=#E9E9E9
| 268139 ||  || — || October 7, 2004 || Kitt Peak || Spacewatch || — || align=right | 2.1 km || 
|-id=140 bgcolor=#d6d6d6
| 268140 ||  || — || October 7, 2004 || Kitt Peak || Spacewatch || — || align=right | 2.8 km || 
|-id=141 bgcolor=#E9E9E9
| 268141 ||  || — || October 8, 2004 || Kitt Peak || Spacewatch || — || align=right | 1.7 km || 
|-id=142 bgcolor=#E9E9E9
| 268142 ||  || — || October 5, 2004 || Kitt Peak || Spacewatch || — || align=right | 2.4 km || 
|-id=143 bgcolor=#E9E9E9
| 268143 ||  || — || October 8, 2004 || Kitt Peak || Spacewatch || — || align=right | 1.8 km || 
|-id=144 bgcolor=#E9E9E9
| 268144 ||  || — || October 8, 2004 || Kitt Peak || Spacewatch || HOF || align=right | 2.9 km || 
|-id=145 bgcolor=#E9E9E9
| 268145 ||  || — || October 8, 2004 || Kitt Peak || Spacewatch || HOF || align=right | 3.0 km || 
|-id=146 bgcolor=#d6d6d6
| 268146 ||  || — || October 9, 2004 || Kitt Peak || Spacewatch || CHA || align=right | 2.4 km || 
|-id=147 bgcolor=#E9E9E9
| 268147 ||  || — || October 7, 2004 || Anderson Mesa || LONEOS || — || align=right | 1.3 km || 
|-id=148 bgcolor=#d6d6d6
| 268148 ||  || — || October 7, 2004 || Anderson Mesa || LONEOS || — || align=right | 3.6 km || 
|-id=149 bgcolor=#E9E9E9
| 268149 ||  || — || October 9, 2004 || Kitt Peak || Spacewatch || — || align=right | 2.4 km || 
|-id=150 bgcolor=#E9E9E9
| 268150 ||  || — || October 9, 2004 || Kitt Peak || Spacewatch || HOF || align=right | 4.6 km || 
|-id=151 bgcolor=#d6d6d6
| 268151 ||  || — || October 8, 2004 || Socorro || LINEAR || — || align=right | 5.2 km || 
|-id=152 bgcolor=#d6d6d6
| 268152 ||  || — || October 8, 2004 || Socorro || LINEAR || BRA || align=right | 2.4 km || 
|-id=153 bgcolor=#d6d6d6
| 268153 ||  || — || October 11, 2004 || Kitt Peak || Spacewatch || — || align=right | 3.0 km || 
|-id=154 bgcolor=#d6d6d6
| 268154 ||  || — || October 9, 2004 || Kitt Peak || Spacewatch || K-2 || align=right | 1.6 km || 
|-id=155 bgcolor=#d6d6d6
| 268155 ||  || — || October 9, 2004 || Kitt Peak || Spacewatch || — || align=right | 2.1 km || 
|-id=156 bgcolor=#E9E9E9
| 268156 ||  || — || October 9, 2004 || Kitt Peak || Spacewatch || AST || align=right | 2.0 km || 
|-id=157 bgcolor=#E9E9E9
| 268157 ||  || — || October 10, 2004 || Kitt Peak || Spacewatch || AGN || align=right | 1.8 km || 
|-id=158 bgcolor=#E9E9E9
| 268158 ||  || — || October 7, 2004 || Socorro || LINEAR || — || align=right | 2.2 km || 
|-id=159 bgcolor=#d6d6d6
| 268159 ||  || — || October 10, 2004 || Palomar || NEAT || — || align=right | 3.5 km || 
|-id=160 bgcolor=#E9E9E9
| 268160 ||  || — || October 6, 2004 || Kitt Peak || Spacewatch || — || align=right | 2.0 km || 
|-id=161 bgcolor=#E9E9E9
| 268161 ||  || — || October 5, 2004 || Kitt Peak || Spacewatch || — || align=right | 1.7 km || 
|-id=162 bgcolor=#d6d6d6
| 268162 ||  || — || October 21, 2004 || Socorro || LINEAR || — || align=right | 2.4 km || 
|-id=163 bgcolor=#d6d6d6
| 268163 ||  || — || November 4, 2004 || Desert Eagle || W. K. Y. Yeung || — || align=right | 3.9 km || 
|-id=164 bgcolor=#E9E9E9
| 268164 ||  || — || November 3, 2004 || Kitt Peak || Spacewatch || — || align=right | 1.8 km || 
|-id=165 bgcolor=#d6d6d6
| 268165 ||  || — || November 3, 2004 || Palomar || NEAT || — || align=right | 2.9 km || 
|-id=166 bgcolor=#E9E9E9
| 268166 ||  || — || November 4, 2004 || Catalina || CSS || — || align=right | 3.6 km || 
|-id=167 bgcolor=#E9E9E9
| 268167 ||  || — || November 10, 2004 || Desert Eagle || W. K. Y. Yeung || — || align=right | 3.3 km || 
|-id=168 bgcolor=#E9E9E9
| 268168 ||  || — || November 5, 2004 || Palomar || NEAT || JUN || align=right | 1.8 km || 
|-id=169 bgcolor=#E9E9E9
| 268169 ||  || — || November 9, 2004 || Catalina || CSS || MRX || align=right | 1.9 km || 
|-id=170 bgcolor=#d6d6d6
| 268170 ||  || — || November 17, 2004 || Campo Imperatore || CINEOS || — || align=right | 2.9 km || 
|-id=171 bgcolor=#E9E9E9
| 268171 ||  || — || November 18, 2004 || Socorro || LINEAR || — || align=right | 2.3 km || 
|-id=172 bgcolor=#d6d6d6
| 268172 ||  || — || December 3, 2004 || Kitt Peak || Spacewatch || — || align=right | 3.5 km || 
|-id=173 bgcolor=#d6d6d6
| 268173 ||  || — || December 8, 2004 || Socorro || LINEAR || — || align=right | 5.1 km || 
|-id=174 bgcolor=#d6d6d6
| 268174 ||  || — || December 9, 2004 || Catalina || CSS || — || align=right | 4.9 km || 
|-id=175 bgcolor=#d6d6d6
| 268175 ||  || — || December 11, 2004 || Kitt Peak || Spacewatch || — || align=right | 5.2 km || 
|-id=176 bgcolor=#d6d6d6
| 268176 ||  || — || December 10, 2004 || Kitt Peak || Spacewatch || — || align=right | 4.3 km || 
|-id=177 bgcolor=#d6d6d6
| 268177 ||  || — || December 10, 2004 || Kitt Peak || Spacewatch || — || align=right | 3.9 km || 
|-id=178 bgcolor=#d6d6d6
| 268178 ||  || — || December 3, 2004 || Kitt Peak || Spacewatch || — || align=right | 3.7 km || 
|-id=179 bgcolor=#d6d6d6
| 268179 ||  || — || December 10, 2004 || Campo Imperatore || CINEOS || 628 || align=right | 2.5 km || 
|-id=180 bgcolor=#d6d6d6
| 268180 ||  || — || December 11, 2004 || Socorro || LINEAR || — || align=right | 3.8 km || 
|-id=181 bgcolor=#d6d6d6
| 268181 ||  || — || December 12, 2004 || Kitt Peak || Spacewatch || EUP || align=right | 5.5 km || 
|-id=182 bgcolor=#d6d6d6
| 268182 ||  || — || December 14, 2004 || Kitt Peak || Spacewatch || EOS || align=right | 3.8 km || 
|-id=183 bgcolor=#d6d6d6
| 268183 ||  || — || December 4, 2004 || Anderson Mesa || LONEOS || EUP || align=right | 6.0 km || 
|-id=184 bgcolor=#d6d6d6
| 268184 ||  || — || December 14, 2004 || Socorro || LINEAR || — || align=right | 3.7 km || 
|-id=185 bgcolor=#d6d6d6
| 268185 ||  || — || December 15, 2004 || Socorro || LINEAR || — || align=right | 3.4 km || 
|-id=186 bgcolor=#d6d6d6
| 268186 ||  || — || December 14, 2004 || Campo Imperatore || CINEOS || — || align=right | 3.0 km || 
|-id=187 bgcolor=#d6d6d6
| 268187 ||  || — || December 17, 2004 || Socorro || LINEAR || — || align=right | 4.5 km || 
|-id=188 bgcolor=#d6d6d6
| 268188 ||  || — || December 16, 2004 || Kitt Peak || Spacewatch || — || align=right | 3.9 km || 
|-id=189 bgcolor=#d6d6d6
| 268189 ||  || — || December 18, 2004 || Mount Lemmon || Mount Lemmon Survey || — || align=right | 3.4 km || 
|-id=190 bgcolor=#d6d6d6
| 268190 ||  || — || December 18, 2004 || Mount Lemmon || Mount Lemmon Survey || — || align=right | 3.7 km || 
|-id=191 bgcolor=#d6d6d6
| 268191 ||  || — || January 6, 2005 || Catalina || CSS || — || align=right | 5.7 km || 
|-id=192 bgcolor=#d6d6d6
| 268192 ||  || — || January 8, 2005 || Campo Imperatore || CINEOS || — || align=right | 4.1 km || 
|-id=193 bgcolor=#d6d6d6
| 268193 ||  || — || January 8, 2005 || Socorro || LINEAR || EUP || align=right | 4.0 km || 
|-id=194 bgcolor=#d6d6d6
| 268194 ||  || — || January 9, 2005 || Catalina || CSS || — || align=right | 5.2 km || 
|-id=195 bgcolor=#d6d6d6
| 268195 ||  || — || January 13, 2005 || Kitt Peak || Spacewatch || CHA || align=right | 3.0 km || 
|-id=196 bgcolor=#d6d6d6
| 268196 ||  || — || January 13, 2005 || Socorro || LINEAR || — || align=right | 4.0 km || 
|-id=197 bgcolor=#d6d6d6
| 268197 ||  || — || January 13, 2005 || Socorro || LINEAR || EUP || align=right | 5.4 km || 
|-id=198 bgcolor=#d6d6d6
| 268198 ||  || — || January 13, 2005 || Catalina || CSS || — || align=right | 3.9 km || 
|-id=199 bgcolor=#d6d6d6
| 268199 ||  || — || January 15, 2005 || Socorro || LINEAR || URS || align=right | 6.1 km || 
|-id=200 bgcolor=#d6d6d6
| 268200 ||  || — || January 15, 2005 || Kitt Peak || Spacewatch || — || align=right | 4.8 km || 
|}

268201–268300 

|-bgcolor=#d6d6d6
| 268201 ||  || — || January 15, 2005 || Socorro || LINEAR || EUP || align=right | 4.4 km || 
|-id=202 bgcolor=#d6d6d6
| 268202 ||  || — || January 15, 2005 || Kitt Peak || Spacewatch || VER || align=right | 3.2 km || 
|-id=203 bgcolor=#d6d6d6
| 268203 ||  || — || January 13, 2005 || Kitt Peak || Spacewatch || VER || align=right | 3.7 km || 
|-id=204 bgcolor=#d6d6d6
| 268204 ||  || — || January 15, 2005 || Kitt Peak || Spacewatch || VER || align=right | 4.2 km || 
|-id=205 bgcolor=#d6d6d6
| 268205 ||  || — || January 7, 2005 || Catalina || CSS || THB || align=right | 4.1 km || 
|-id=206 bgcolor=#d6d6d6
| 268206 ||  || — || January 16, 2005 || Kitt Peak || Spacewatch || — || align=right | 5.7 km || 
|-id=207 bgcolor=#d6d6d6
| 268207 ||  || — || January 16, 2005 || Socorro || LINEAR || — || align=right | 3.7 km || 
|-id=208 bgcolor=#d6d6d6
| 268208 ||  || — || January 16, 2005 || Kitt Peak || Spacewatch || — || align=right | 3.1 km || 
|-id=209 bgcolor=#d6d6d6
| 268209 ||  || — || January 16, 2005 || Kitt Peak || Spacewatch || — || align=right | 4.9 km || 
|-id=210 bgcolor=#d6d6d6
| 268210 ||  || — || January 16, 2005 || Kitt Peak || Spacewatch || — || align=right | 4.8 km || 
|-id=211 bgcolor=#d6d6d6
| 268211 ||  || — || January 17, 2005 || Kitt Peak || Spacewatch || — || align=right | 3.4 km || 
|-id=212 bgcolor=#d6d6d6
| 268212 ||  || — || January 17, 2005 || Kitt Peak || Spacewatch || VER || align=right | 3.6 km || 
|-id=213 bgcolor=#d6d6d6
| 268213 ||  || — || February 1, 2005 || Catalina || CSS || EUP || align=right | 5.8 km || 
|-id=214 bgcolor=#d6d6d6
| 268214 ||  || — || February 1, 2005 || Catalina || CSS || HYG || align=right | 4.1 km || 
|-id=215 bgcolor=#d6d6d6
| 268215 ||  || — || February 2, 2005 || Catalina || CSS || — || align=right | 5.1 km || 
|-id=216 bgcolor=#d6d6d6
| 268216 ||  || — || February 1, 2005 || Kitt Peak || Spacewatch || HYG || align=right | 4.0 km || 
|-id=217 bgcolor=#d6d6d6
| 268217 ||  || — || February 7, 2005 || Altschwendt || Altschwendt Obs. || 7:4 || align=right | 4.9 km || 
|-id=218 bgcolor=#d6d6d6
| 268218 ||  || — || February 4, 2005 || Kitt Peak || Spacewatch || — || align=right | 3.4 km || 
|-id=219 bgcolor=#d6d6d6
| 268219 ||  || — || February 2, 2005 || Kitt Peak || Spacewatch || — || align=right | 3.8 km || 
|-id=220 bgcolor=#d6d6d6
| 268220 ||  || — || February 1, 2005 || Catalina || CSS || — || align=right | 4.3 km || 
|-id=221 bgcolor=#d6d6d6
| 268221 ||  || — || February 2, 2005 || Catalina || CSS || — || align=right | 4.4 km || 
|-id=222 bgcolor=#d6d6d6
| 268222 ||  || — || February 1, 2005 || Kitt Peak || Spacewatch || — || align=right | 4.2 km || 
|-id=223 bgcolor=#d6d6d6
| 268223 ||  || — || March 1, 2005 || Kitt Peak || Spacewatch || — || align=right | 3.8 km || 
|-id=224 bgcolor=#d6d6d6
| 268224 ||  || — || March 3, 2005 || Kitt Peak || Spacewatch || HYG || align=right | 4.9 km || 
|-id=225 bgcolor=#d6d6d6
| 268225 ||  || — || March 3, 2005 || Catalina || CSS || — || align=right | 3.7 km || 
|-id=226 bgcolor=#E9E9E9
| 268226 ||  || — || March 3, 2005 || Catalina || CSS || — || align=right | 4.0 km || 
|-id=227 bgcolor=#d6d6d6
| 268227 ||  || — || March 4, 2005 || Gnosca || S. Sposetti || HYG || align=right | 3.3 km || 
|-id=228 bgcolor=#d6d6d6
| 268228 ||  || — || March 3, 2005 || Kitt Peak || Spacewatch || THM || align=right | 3.6 km || 
|-id=229 bgcolor=#d6d6d6
| 268229 ||  || — || March 3, 2005 || Catalina || CSS || — || align=right | 4.9 km || 
|-id=230 bgcolor=#d6d6d6
| 268230 ||  || — || March 2, 2005 || Catalina || CSS || EUP || align=right | 5.0 km || 
|-id=231 bgcolor=#d6d6d6
| 268231 ||  || — || March 8, 2005 || Socorro || LINEAR || EUP || align=right | 5.4 km || 
|-id=232 bgcolor=#d6d6d6
| 268232 ||  || — || March 9, 2005 || Anderson Mesa || LONEOS || 7:4 || align=right | 8.2 km || 
|-id=233 bgcolor=#d6d6d6
| 268233 ||  || — || March 7, 2005 || Socorro || LINEAR || — || align=right | 6.8 km || 
|-id=234 bgcolor=#d6d6d6
| 268234 ||  || — || March 10, 2005 || Siding Spring || SSS || EUP || align=right | 4.7 km || 
|-id=235 bgcolor=#d6d6d6
| 268235 ||  || — || March 12, 2005 || Kitt Peak || Spacewatch || — || align=right | 3.5 km || 
|-id=236 bgcolor=#d6d6d6
| 268236 ||  || — || March 10, 2005 || Mount Lemmon || Mount Lemmon Survey || — || align=right | 4.3 km || 
|-id=237 bgcolor=#fefefe
| 268237 ||  || — || April 5, 2005 || Kitt Peak || Spacewatch || — || align=right data-sort-value="0.97" | 970 m || 
|-id=238 bgcolor=#d6d6d6
| 268238 ||  || — || April 2, 2005 || Mount Lemmon || Mount Lemmon Survey || HYG || align=right | 4.1 km || 
|-id=239 bgcolor=#E9E9E9
| 268239 ||  || — || April 10, 2005 || Mount Lemmon || Mount Lemmon Survey || — || align=right | 3.5 km || 
|-id=240 bgcolor=#d6d6d6
| 268240 ||  || — || April 12, 2005 || Kitt Peak || Spacewatch || — || align=right | 6.0 km || 
|-id=241 bgcolor=#fefefe
| 268241 ||  || — || April 30, 2005 || Kitt Peak || Spacewatch || — || align=right data-sort-value="0.88" | 880 m || 
|-id=242 bgcolor=#fefefe
| 268242 Pebble ||  ||  || May 4, 2005 || Haleakala || J. Bedient || — || align=right data-sort-value="0.87" | 870 m || 
|-id=243 bgcolor=#fefefe
| 268243 ||  || — || May 10, 2005 || Kitt Peak || Spacewatch || — || align=right data-sort-value="0.93" | 930 m || 
|-id=244 bgcolor=#fefefe
| 268244 ||  || — || May 15, 2005 || Mount Lemmon || Mount Lemmon Survey || — || align=right data-sort-value="0.69" | 690 m || 
|-id=245 bgcolor=#fefefe
| 268245 ||  || — || June 12, 2005 || Kitt Peak || Spacewatch || ERI || align=right | 2.5 km || 
|-id=246 bgcolor=#fefefe
| 268246 ||  || — || June 17, 2005 || Mount Lemmon || Mount Lemmon Survey || — || align=right | 1.3 km || 
|-id=247 bgcolor=#fefefe
| 268247 ||  || — || June 27, 2005 || Kitt Peak || Spacewatch || — || align=right data-sort-value="0.94" | 940 m || 
|-id=248 bgcolor=#fefefe
| 268248 ||  || — || June 28, 2005 || Palomar || NEAT || — || align=right data-sort-value="0.87" | 870 m || 
|-id=249 bgcolor=#fefefe
| 268249 ||  || — || June 30, 2005 || Kitt Peak || Spacewatch || FLO || align=right data-sort-value="0.82" | 820 m || 
|-id=250 bgcolor=#fefefe
| 268250 ||  || — || June 30, 2005 || Kitt Peak || Spacewatch || — || align=right data-sort-value="0.98" | 980 m || 
|-id=251 bgcolor=#FA8072
| 268251 ||  || — || June 28, 2005 || Kitt Peak || Spacewatch || — || align=right data-sort-value="0.78" | 780 m || 
|-id=252 bgcolor=#fefefe
| 268252 ||  || — || June 29, 2005 || Kitt Peak || Spacewatch || NYS || align=right data-sort-value="0.83" | 830 m || 
|-id=253 bgcolor=#fefefe
| 268253 ||  || — || June 29, 2005 || Kitt Peak || Spacewatch || — || align=right data-sort-value="0.85" | 850 m || 
|-id=254 bgcolor=#E9E9E9
| 268254 ||  || — || June 30, 2005 || Kitt Peak || Spacewatch || — || align=right | 1.3 km || 
|-id=255 bgcolor=#fefefe
| 268255 ||  || — || July 3, 2005 || Mount Lemmon || Mount Lemmon Survey || FLO || align=right data-sort-value="0.76" | 760 m || 
|-id=256 bgcolor=#fefefe
| 268256 ||  || — || July 5, 2005 || Mount Lemmon || Mount Lemmon Survey || MAS || align=right data-sort-value="0.84" | 840 m || 
|-id=257 bgcolor=#fefefe
| 268257 ||  || — || July 6, 2005 || Reedy Creek || J. Broughton || — || align=right | 1.3 km || 
|-id=258 bgcolor=#fefefe
| 268258 ||  || — || July 5, 2005 || Kitt Peak || Spacewatch || NYS || align=right data-sort-value="0.77" | 770 m || 
|-id=259 bgcolor=#fefefe
| 268259 ||  || — || July 5, 2005 || Palomar || NEAT || FLO || align=right data-sort-value="0.73" | 730 m || 
|-id=260 bgcolor=#fefefe
| 268260 ||  || — || July 10, 2005 || Jarnac || Jarnac Obs. || FLO || align=right data-sort-value="0.87" | 870 m || 
|-id=261 bgcolor=#fefefe
| 268261 ||  || — || July 10, 2005 || Kitt Peak || Spacewatch || — || align=right | 1.2 km || 
|-id=262 bgcolor=#fefefe
| 268262 ||  || — || July 3, 2005 || Mount Lemmon || Mount Lemmon Survey || MAS || align=right | 1.0 km || 
|-id=263 bgcolor=#fefefe
| 268263 ||  || — || July 6, 2005 || Siding Spring || SSS || — || align=right | 1.5 km || 
|-id=264 bgcolor=#fefefe
| 268264 ||  || — || July 8, 2005 || Kitt Peak || Spacewatch || — || align=right | 1.0 km || 
|-id=265 bgcolor=#fefefe
| 268265 ||  || — || July 28, 2005 || Palomar || NEAT || FLO || align=right data-sort-value="0.96" | 960 m || 
|-id=266 bgcolor=#fefefe
| 268266 ||  || — || July 26, 2005 || Palomar || NEAT || V || align=right data-sort-value="0.74" | 740 m || 
|-id=267 bgcolor=#fefefe
| 268267 ||  || — || July 27, 2005 || Palomar || NEAT || NYS || align=right data-sort-value="0.84" | 840 m || 
|-id=268 bgcolor=#fefefe
| 268268 ||  || — || July 30, 2005 || Palomar || NEAT || FLO || align=right data-sort-value="0.81" | 810 m || 
|-id=269 bgcolor=#fefefe
| 268269 ||  || — || July 28, 2005 || Palomar || NEAT || V || align=right data-sort-value="0.82" | 820 m || 
|-id=270 bgcolor=#fefefe
| 268270 ||  || — || July 29, 2005 || Palomar || NEAT || V || align=right data-sort-value="0.88" | 880 m || 
|-id=271 bgcolor=#fefefe
| 268271 ||  || — || July 29, 2005 || Siding Spring || SSS || — || align=right | 1.3 km || 
|-id=272 bgcolor=#fefefe
| 268272 ||  || — || July 30, 2005 || Palomar || NEAT || — || align=right | 1.3 km || 
|-id=273 bgcolor=#fefefe
| 268273 ||  || — || August 1, 2005 || Siding Spring || SSS || — || align=right | 1.5 km || 
|-id=274 bgcolor=#fefefe
| 268274 ||  || — || August 7, 2005 || Reedy Creek || J. Broughton || — || align=right | 2.1 km || 
|-id=275 bgcolor=#fefefe
| 268275 ||  || — || August 4, 2005 || Palomar || NEAT || — || align=right | 1.2 km || 
|-id=276 bgcolor=#fefefe
| 268276 ||  || — || August 4, 2005 || Palomar || NEAT || V || align=right data-sort-value="0.76" | 760 m || 
|-id=277 bgcolor=#fefefe
| 268277 ||  || — || August 6, 2005 || Palomar || NEAT || V || align=right data-sort-value="0.87" | 870 m || 
|-id=278 bgcolor=#fefefe
| 268278 ||  || — || August 8, 2005 || Cerro Tololo || M. W. Buie || — || align=right | 1.2 km || 
|-id=279 bgcolor=#fefefe
| 268279 ||  || — || August 24, 2005 || Palomar || NEAT || — || align=right data-sort-value="0.92" | 920 m || 
|-id=280 bgcolor=#fefefe
| 268280 ||  || — || August 22, 2005 || Palomar || NEAT || — || align=right | 1.2 km || 
|-id=281 bgcolor=#fefefe
| 268281 ||  || — || August 25, 2005 || Palomar || NEAT || V || align=right data-sort-value="0.77" | 770 m || 
|-id=282 bgcolor=#fefefe
| 268282 ||  || — || August 27, 2005 || Kitt Peak || Spacewatch || — || align=right | 1.1 km || 
|-id=283 bgcolor=#fefefe
| 268283 ||  || — || August 24, 2005 || Palomar || NEAT || — || align=right | 1.1 km || 
|-id=284 bgcolor=#fefefe
| 268284 ||  || — || August 22, 2005 || Haleakala || NEAT || — || align=right | 1.8 km || 
|-id=285 bgcolor=#fefefe
| 268285 ||  || — || August 25, 2005 || Palomar || NEAT || — || align=right | 1.5 km || 
|-id=286 bgcolor=#fefefe
| 268286 ||  || — || August 26, 2005 || Anderson Mesa || LONEOS || — || align=right | 2.8 km || 
|-id=287 bgcolor=#fefefe
| 268287 ||  || — || August 26, 2005 || Palomar || NEAT || NYS || align=right | 1.0 km || 
|-id=288 bgcolor=#fefefe
| 268288 ||  || — || August 26, 2005 || Palomar || NEAT || MAS || align=right data-sort-value="0.83" | 830 m || 
|-id=289 bgcolor=#fefefe
| 268289 ||  || — || August 28, 2005 || Kitt Peak || Spacewatch || — || align=right | 2.4 km || 
|-id=290 bgcolor=#fefefe
| 268290 ||  || — || August 26, 2005 || Palomar || NEAT || V || align=right data-sort-value="0.78" | 780 m || 
|-id=291 bgcolor=#fefefe
| 268291 ||  || — || August 29, 2005 || Anderson Mesa || LONEOS || NYS || align=right data-sort-value="0.80" | 800 m || 
|-id=292 bgcolor=#fefefe
| 268292 ||  || — || August 29, 2005 || Anderson Mesa || LONEOS || NYS || align=right data-sort-value="0.93" | 930 m || 
|-id=293 bgcolor=#fefefe
| 268293 ||  || — || August 27, 2005 || Siding Spring || SSS || — || align=right | 1.3 km || 
|-id=294 bgcolor=#fefefe
| 268294 ||  || — || August 29, 2005 || Anderson Mesa || LONEOS || — || align=right | 1.0 km || 
|-id=295 bgcolor=#fefefe
| 268295 ||  || — || August 29, 2005 || Anderson Mesa || LONEOS || V || align=right data-sort-value="0.84" | 840 m || 
|-id=296 bgcolor=#E9E9E9
| 268296 ||  || — || August 30, 2005 || Kitt Peak || Spacewatch || — || align=right | 1.8 km || 
|-id=297 bgcolor=#fefefe
| 268297 ||  || — || August 31, 2005 || Socorro || LINEAR || — || align=right | 1.3 km || 
|-id=298 bgcolor=#fefefe
| 268298 ||  || — || August 30, 2005 || Saint-Véran || Saint-Véran Obs. || — || align=right | 1.2 km || 
|-id=299 bgcolor=#fefefe
| 268299 ||  || — || August 26, 2005 || Anderson Mesa || LONEOS || MAS || align=right data-sort-value="0.71" | 710 m || 
|-id=300 bgcolor=#fefefe
| 268300 ||  || — || August 27, 2005 || Palomar || NEAT || V || align=right data-sort-value="0.80" | 800 m || 
|}

268301–268400 

|-bgcolor=#fefefe
| 268301 ||  || — || August 27, 2005 || Palomar || NEAT || — || align=right | 1.2 km || 
|-id=302 bgcolor=#fefefe
| 268302 ||  || — || August 27, 2005 || Palomar || NEAT || — || align=right data-sort-value="0.99" | 990 m || 
|-id=303 bgcolor=#fefefe
| 268303 ||  || — || August 27, 2005 || Palomar || NEAT || — || align=right | 1.5 km || 
|-id=304 bgcolor=#fefefe
| 268304 ||  || — || August 27, 2005 || Palomar || NEAT || — || align=right | 1.2 km || 
|-id=305 bgcolor=#fefefe
| 268305 ||  || — || August 27, 2005 || Palomar || NEAT || V || align=right data-sort-value="0.93" | 930 m || 
|-id=306 bgcolor=#fefefe
| 268306 ||  || — || August 28, 2005 || Kitt Peak || Spacewatch || — || align=right | 1.0 km || 
|-id=307 bgcolor=#fefefe
| 268307 ||  || — || August 28, 2005 || Kitt Peak || Spacewatch || MAS || align=right data-sort-value="0.92" | 920 m || 
|-id=308 bgcolor=#E9E9E9
| 268308 ||  || — || August 28, 2005 || Kitt Peak || Spacewatch || — || align=right | 1.00 km || 
|-id=309 bgcolor=#fefefe
| 268309 ||  || — || August 28, 2005 || Kitt Peak || Spacewatch || NYS || align=right data-sort-value="0.86" | 860 m || 
|-id=310 bgcolor=#E9E9E9
| 268310 ||  || — || August 28, 2005 || Kitt Peak || Spacewatch || BAR || align=right | 1.3 km || 
|-id=311 bgcolor=#fefefe
| 268311 ||  || — || August 29, 2005 || Socorro || LINEAR || V || align=right data-sort-value="0.93" | 930 m || 
|-id=312 bgcolor=#fefefe
| 268312 ||  || — || August 30, 2005 || Kitt Peak || Spacewatch || — || align=right | 1.1 km || 
|-id=313 bgcolor=#fefefe
| 268313 ||  || — || August 28, 2005 || Siding Spring || SSS || NYS || align=right data-sort-value="0.81" | 810 m || 
|-id=314 bgcolor=#fefefe
| 268314 ||  || — || August 31, 2005 || Kitt Peak || Spacewatch || LCI || align=right | 1.1 km || 
|-id=315 bgcolor=#fefefe
| 268315 ||  || — || August 27, 2005 || Palomar || NEAT || — || align=right | 1.3 km || 
|-id=316 bgcolor=#fefefe
| 268316 ||  || — || August 28, 2005 || Anderson Mesa || LONEOS || — || align=right | 1.7 km || 
|-id=317 bgcolor=#fefefe
| 268317 ||  || — || August 28, 2005 || Siding Spring || SSS || FLO || align=right | 1.1 km || 
|-id=318 bgcolor=#fefefe
| 268318 ||  || — || August 28, 2005 || Siding Spring || SSS || — || align=right data-sort-value="0.95" | 950 m || 
|-id=319 bgcolor=#d6d6d6
| 268319 ||  || — || August 26, 2005 || Palomar || NEAT || — || align=right | 6.5 km || 
|-id=320 bgcolor=#fefefe
| 268320 ||  || — || September 9, 2005 || Socorro || LINEAR || NYS || align=right data-sort-value="0.79" | 790 m || 
|-id=321 bgcolor=#fefefe
| 268321 ||  || — || September 1, 2005 || Kitt Peak || Spacewatch || — || align=right | 1.2 km || 
|-id=322 bgcolor=#fefefe
| 268322 ||  || — || September 9, 2005 || Apache Point || A. C. Becker || MAS || align=right data-sort-value="0.85" | 850 m || 
|-id=323 bgcolor=#fefefe
| 268323 ||  || — || September 25, 2005 || Catalina || CSS || — || align=right | 2.9 km || 
|-id=324 bgcolor=#fefefe
| 268324 ||  || — || September 26, 2005 || Kitt Peak || Spacewatch || — || align=right | 1.0 km || 
|-id=325 bgcolor=#fefefe
| 268325 ||  || — || September 23, 2005 || Catalina || CSS || — || align=right | 1.6 km || 
|-id=326 bgcolor=#fefefe
| 268326 ||  || — || September 24, 2005 || Kitt Peak || Spacewatch || — || align=right data-sort-value="0.89" | 890 m || 
|-id=327 bgcolor=#fefefe
| 268327 ||  || — || September 24, 2005 || Kitt Peak || Spacewatch || NYS || align=right data-sort-value="0.80" | 800 m || 
|-id=328 bgcolor=#fefefe
| 268328 ||  || — || September 24, 2005 || Kitt Peak || Spacewatch || FLO || align=right data-sort-value="0.84" | 840 m || 
|-id=329 bgcolor=#fefefe
| 268329 ||  || — || September 24, 2005 || Kitt Peak || Spacewatch || — || align=right data-sort-value="0.98" | 980 m || 
|-id=330 bgcolor=#E9E9E9
| 268330 ||  || — || September 24, 2005 || Kitt Peak || Spacewatch || — || align=right | 1.0 km || 
|-id=331 bgcolor=#E9E9E9
| 268331 ||  || — || September 24, 2005 || Kitt Peak || Spacewatch || — || align=right data-sort-value="0.91" | 910 m || 
|-id=332 bgcolor=#E9E9E9
| 268332 ||  || — || September 25, 2005 || Palomar || NEAT || — || align=right | 1.0 km || 
|-id=333 bgcolor=#E9E9E9
| 268333 ||  || — || September 25, 2005 || Kitt Peak || Spacewatch || — || align=right | 1.6 km || 
|-id=334 bgcolor=#fefefe
| 268334 ||  || — || September 25, 2005 || Kitt Peak || Spacewatch || SUL || align=right | 2.1 km || 
|-id=335 bgcolor=#fefefe
| 268335 ||  || — || September 25, 2005 || Palomar || NEAT || — || align=right | 1.6 km || 
|-id=336 bgcolor=#fefefe
| 268336 ||  || — || September 27, 2005 || Kitt Peak || Spacewatch || NYS || align=right data-sort-value="0.95" | 950 m || 
|-id=337 bgcolor=#E9E9E9
| 268337 ||  || — || September 29, 2005 || Kitt Peak || Spacewatch || — || align=right | 1.5 km || 
|-id=338 bgcolor=#fefefe
| 268338 ||  || — || September 25, 2005 || Kitt Peak || Spacewatch || ERI || align=right | 1.6 km || 
|-id=339 bgcolor=#E9E9E9
| 268339 ||  || — || September 25, 2005 || Kitt Peak || Spacewatch || — || align=right | 1.4 km || 
|-id=340 bgcolor=#E9E9E9
| 268340 ||  || — || September 26, 2005 || Socorro || LINEAR || — || align=right | 1.5 km || 
|-id=341 bgcolor=#fefefe
| 268341 ||  || — || September 27, 2005 || Socorro || LINEAR || V || align=right data-sort-value="0.99" | 990 m || 
|-id=342 bgcolor=#fefefe
| 268342 ||  || — || September 27, 2005 || Palomar || NEAT || V || align=right data-sort-value="0.90" | 900 m || 
|-id=343 bgcolor=#E9E9E9
| 268343 ||  || — || September 29, 2005 || Kitt Peak || Spacewatch || — || align=right | 1.2 km || 
|-id=344 bgcolor=#fefefe
| 268344 ||  || — || September 29, 2005 || Kitt Peak || Spacewatch || — || align=right data-sort-value="0.99" | 990 m || 
|-id=345 bgcolor=#E9E9E9
| 268345 ||  || — || September 30, 2005 || Mount Lemmon || Mount Lemmon Survey || — || align=right | 1.1 km || 
|-id=346 bgcolor=#fefefe
| 268346 ||  || — || September 29, 2005 || Kitt Peak || Spacewatch || NYS || align=right data-sort-value="0.72" | 720 m || 
|-id=347 bgcolor=#E9E9E9
| 268347 ||  || — || September 30, 2005 || Mount Lemmon || Mount Lemmon Survey || — || align=right | 1.1 km || 
|-id=348 bgcolor=#fefefe
| 268348 ||  || — || September 30, 2005 || Mount Lemmon || Mount Lemmon Survey || — || align=right | 1.1 km || 
|-id=349 bgcolor=#E9E9E9
| 268349 ||  || — || September 30, 2005 || Kitt Peak || Spacewatch || — || align=right data-sort-value="0.94" | 940 m || 
|-id=350 bgcolor=#fefefe
| 268350 ||  || — || September 24, 2005 || Palomar || NEAT || NYS || align=right data-sort-value="0.91" | 910 m || 
|-id=351 bgcolor=#fefefe
| 268351 ||  || — || September 22, 2005 || Palomar || NEAT || V || align=right data-sort-value="0.74" | 740 m || 
|-id=352 bgcolor=#fefefe
| 268352 ||  || — || September 22, 2005 || Palomar || NEAT || NYS || align=right | 2.5 km || 
|-id=353 bgcolor=#fefefe
| 268353 ||  || — || September 30, 2005 || Mount Lemmon || Mount Lemmon Survey || MAS || align=right data-sort-value="0.92" | 920 m || 
|-id=354 bgcolor=#fefefe
| 268354 ||  || — || October 1, 2005 || Mount Lemmon || Mount Lemmon Survey || NYS || align=right data-sort-value="0.87" | 870 m || 
|-id=355 bgcolor=#E9E9E9
| 268355 ||  || — || October 1, 2005 || Catalina || CSS || — || align=right | 1.7 km || 
|-id=356 bgcolor=#fefefe
| 268356 ||  || — || October 1, 2005 || Catalina || CSS || V || align=right data-sort-value="0.95" | 950 m || 
|-id=357 bgcolor=#E9E9E9
| 268357 ||  || — || October 1, 2005 || Mount Lemmon || Mount Lemmon Survey || — || align=right | 1.5 km || 
|-id=358 bgcolor=#fefefe
| 268358 ||  || — || October 2, 2005 || Mount Lemmon || Mount Lemmon Survey || — || align=right data-sort-value="0.97" | 970 m || 
|-id=359 bgcolor=#E9E9E9
| 268359 ||  || — || October 2, 2005 || Catalina || CSS || ADE || align=right | 2.7 km || 
|-id=360 bgcolor=#fefefe
| 268360 ||  || — || October 1, 2005 || Kitt Peak || Spacewatch || — || align=right data-sort-value="0.98" | 980 m || 
|-id=361 bgcolor=#fefefe
| 268361 ||  || — || October 3, 2005 || Catalina || CSS || — || align=right | 1.4 km || 
|-id=362 bgcolor=#fefefe
| 268362 ||  || — || October 3, 2005 || Kitt Peak || Spacewatch || — || align=right | 1.1 km || 
|-id=363 bgcolor=#E9E9E9
| 268363 ||  || — || October 7, 2005 || Socorro || LINEAR || — || align=right | 2.3 km || 
|-id=364 bgcolor=#fefefe
| 268364 ||  || — || October 7, 2005 || Kitt Peak || Spacewatch || NYS || align=right data-sort-value="0.88" | 880 m || 
|-id=365 bgcolor=#fefefe
| 268365 ||  || — || October 7, 2005 || Kitt Peak || Spacewatch || — || align=right data-sort-value="0.85" | 850 m || 
|-id=366 bgcolor=#fefefe
| 268366 ||  || — || October 7, 2005 || Kitt Peak || Spacewatch || — || align=right | 1.2 km || 
|-id=367 bgcolor=#fefefe
| 268367 ||  || — || October 7, 2005 || Catalina || CSS || NYS || align=right data-sort-value="0.75" | 750 m || 
|-id=368 bgcolor=#E9E9E9
| 268368 ||  || — || October 7, 2005 || Kitt Peak || Spacewatch || — || align=right data-sort-value="0.89" | 890 m || 
|-id=369 bgcolor=#E9E9E9
| 268369 ||  || — || October 6, 2005 || Kitt Peak || Spacewatch || — || align=right data-sort-value="0.82" | 820 m || 
|-id=370 bgcolor=#E9E9E9
| 268370 ||  || — || October 8, 2005 || Kitt Peak || Spacewatch || — || align=right data-sort-value="0.98" | 980 m || 
|-id=371 bgcolor=#fefefe
| 268371 ||  || — || October 8, 2005 || Kitt Peak || Spacewatch || — || align=right | 1.1 km || 
|-id=372 bgcolor=#fefefe
| 268372 ||  || — || October 8, 2005 || Kitt Peak || Spacewatch || NYS || align=right data-sort-value="0.88" | 880 m || 
|-id=373 bgcolor=#E9E9E9
| 268373 ||  || — || October 9, 2005 || Kitt Peak || Spacewatch || — || align=right data-sort-value="0.94" | 940 m || 
|-id=374 bgcolor=#E9E9E9
| 268374 ||  || — || October 9, 2005 || Kitt Peak || Spacewatch || — || align=right | 1.1 km || 
|-id=375 bgcolor=#E9E9E9
| 268375 ||  || — || October 9, 2005 || Kitt Peak || Spacewatch || — || align=right | 1.7 km || 
|-id=376 bgcolor=#fefefe
| 268376 ||  || — || October 1, 2005 || Catalina || CSS || V || align=right | 1.0 km || 
|-id=377 bgcolor=#fefefe
| 268377 ||  || — || October 1, 2005 || Catalina || CSS || V || align=right data-sort-value="0.97" | 970 m || 
|-id=378 bgcolor=#E9E9E9
| 268378 ||  || — || October 22, 2005 || Catalina || CSS || — || align=right | 2.4 km || 
|-id=379 bgcolor=#fefefe
| 268379 ||  || — || October 23, 2005 || Kitt Peak || Spacewatch || — || align=right | 1.2 km || 
|-id=380 bgcolor=#fefefe
| 268380 ||  || — || October 23, 2005 || Kitt Peak || Spacewatch || NYS || align=right data-sort-value="0.97" | 970 m || 
|-id=381 bgcolor=#E9E9E9
| 268381 ||  || — || October 23, 2005 || Catalina || CSS || — || align=right | 1.8 km || 
|-id=382 bgcolor=#E9E9E9
| 268382 ||  || — || October 23, 2005 || Catalina || CSS || — || align=right | 2.0 km || 
|-id=383 bgcolor=#E9E9E9
| 268383 ||  || — || October 24, 2005 || Anderson Mesa || LONEOS || — || align=right | 1.5 km || 
|-id=384 bgcolor=#E9E9E9
| 268384 ||  || — || October 24, 2005 || Anderson Mesa || LONEOS || — || align=right | 2.1 km || 
|-id=385 bgcolor=#E9E9E9
| 268385 ||  || — || October 25, 2005 || Mount Lemmon || Mount Lemmon Survey || — || align=right | 1.6 km || 
|-id=386 bgcolor=#E9E9E9
| 268386 ||  || — || October 25, 2005 || Mount Lemmon || Mount Lemmon Survey || — || align=right | 1.1 km || 
|-id=387 bgcolor=#fefefe
| 268387 ||  || — || October 22, 2005 || Kitt Peak || Spacewatch || — || align=right | 1.3 km || 
|-id=388 bgcolor=#E9E9E9
| 268388 ||  || — || October 22, 2005 || Kitt Peak || Spacewatch || — || align=right | 1.1 km || 
|-id=389 bgcolor=#E9E9E9
| 268389 ||  || — || October 24, 2005 || Kitt Peak || Spacewatch || — || align=right | 1.4 km || 
|-id=390 bgcolor=#E9E9E9
| 268390 ||  || — || October 24, 2005 || Kitt Peak || Spacewatch || — || align=right | 2.0 km || 
|-id=391 bgcolor=#fefefe
| 268391 ||  || — || October 25, 2005 || Mount Lemmon || Mount Lemmon Survey || V || align=right data-sort-value="0.88" | 880 m || 
|-id=392 bgcolor=#E9E9E9
| 268392 ||  || — || October 25, 2005 || Mount Lemmon || Mount Lemmon Survey || — || align=right | 1.4 km || 
|-id=393 bgcolor=#E9E9E9
| 268393 ||  || — || October 26, 2005 || Kitt Peak || Spacewatch || — || align=right | 1.3 km || 
|-id=394 bgcolor=#E9E9E9
| 268394 ||  || — || October 26, 2005 || Kitt Peak || Spacewatch || — || align=right | 1.4 km || 
|-id=395 bgcolor=#fefefe
| 268395 ||  || — || October 26, 2005 || Palomar || NEAT || — || align=right | 1.2 km || 
|-id=396 bgcolor=#E9E9E9
| 268396 ||  || — || October 26, 2005 || Kitt Peak || Spacewatch || — || align=right | 1.7 km || 
|-id=397 bgcolor=#E9E9E9
| 268397 ||  || — || October 24, 2005 || Kitt Peak || Spacewatch || — || align=right | 1.7 km || 
|-id=398 bgcolor=#E9E9E9
| 268398 ||  || — || October 24, 2005 || Kitt Peak || Spacewatch || — || align=right | 1.5 km || 
|-id=399 bgcolor=#E9E9E9
| 268399 ||  || — || October 25, 2005 || Mount Lemmon || Mount Lemmon Survey || — || align=right | 1.5 km || 
|-id=400 bgcolor=#E9E9E9
| 268400 ||  || — || October 22, 2005 || Kitt Peak || Spacewatch || — || align=right data-sort-value="0.96" | 960 m || 
|}

268401–268500 

|-bgcolor=#fefefe
| 268401 ||  || — || October 22, 2005 || Kitt Peak || Spacewatch || MAS || align=right data-sort-value="0.82" | 820 m || 
|-id=402 bgcolor=#E9E9E9
| 268402 ||  || — || October 25, 2005 || Kitt Peak || Spacewatch || — || align=right data-sort-value="0.98" | 980 m || 
|-id=403 bgcolor=#E9E9E9
| 268403 ||  || — || October 25, 2005 || Kitt Peak || Spacewatch || — || align=right | 1.3 km || 
|-id=404 bgcolor=#E9E9E9
| 268404 ||  || — || October 26, 2005 || Kitt Peak || Spacewatch || — || align=right | 1.6 km || 
|-id=405 bgcolor=#E9E9E9
| 268405 ||  || — || October 25, 2005 || Kitt Peak || Spacewatch || — || align=right | 1.6 km || 
|-id=406 bgcolor=#fefefe
| 268406 ||  || — || October 25, 2005 || Kitt Peak || Spacewatch || NYS || align=right data-sort-value="0.84" | 840 m || 
|-id=407 bgcolor=#E9E9E9
| 268407 ||  || — || October 25, 2005 || Kitt Peak || Spacewatch || — || align=right | 1.6 km || 
|-id=408 bgcolor=#E9E9E9
| 268408 ||  || — || October 26, 2005 || Kitt Peak || Spacewatch || — || align=right data-sort-value="0.96" | 960 m || 
|-id=409 bgcolor=#fefefe
| 268409 ||  || — || October 26, 2005 || Kitt Peak || Spacewatch || — || align=right | 1.1 km || 
|-id=410 bgcolor=#E9E9E9
| 268410 ||  || — || October 27, 2005 || Mount Lemmon || Mount Lemmon Survey || — || align=right | 1.2 km || 
|-id=411 bgcolor=#E9E9E9
| 268411 ||  || — || October 27, 2005 || Mount Lemmon || Mount Lemmon Survey || — || align=right | 1.5 km || 
|-id=412 bgcolor=#E9E9E9
| 268412 ||  || — || October 27, 2005 || Socorro || LINEAR || — || align=right | 1.4 km || 
|-id=413 bgcolor=#fefefe
| 268413 ||  || — || October 28, 2005 || Catalina || CSS || LCI || align=right | 1.9 km || 
|-id=414 bgcolor=#E9E9E9
| 268414 ||  || — || October 27, 2005 || Kitt Peak || Spacewatch || — || align=right | 1.8 km || 
|-id=415 bgcolor=#E9E9E9
| 268415 ||  || — || October 29, 2005 || Catalina || CSS || ADE || align=right | 2.5 km || 
|-id=416 bgcolor=#E9E9E9
| 268416 ||  || — || October 27, 2005 || Kitt Peak || Spacewatch || — || align=right | 1.3 km || 
|-id=417 bgcolor=#E9E9E9
| 268417 ||  || — || October 27, 2005 || Kitt Peak || Spacewatch || — || align=right | 1.4 km || 
|-id=418 bgcolor=#E9E9E9
| 268418 ||  || — || October 30, 2005 || Mount Lemmon || Mount Lemmon Survey || — || align=right data-sort-value="0.95" | 950 m || 
|-id=419 bgcolor=#E9E9E9
| 268419 ||  || — || October 30, 2005 || Mount Lemmon || Mount Lemmon Survey || — || align=right | 1.4 km || 
|-id=420 bgcolor=#E9E9E9
| 268420 ||  || — || October 27, 2005 || Mount Lemmon || Mount Lemmon Survey || — || align=right data-sort-value="0.98" | 980 m || 
|-id=421 bgcolor=#E9E9E9
| 268421 ||  || — || October 30, 2005 || Kitt Peak || Spacewatch || HOF || align=right | 3.6 km || 
|-id=422 bgcolor=#E9E9E9
| 268422 ||  || — || October 22, 2005 || Kitt Peak || Spacewatch || — || align=right | 2.4 km || 
|-id=423 bgcolor=#E9E9E9
| 268423 ||  || — || October 22, 2005 || Catalina || CSS || — || align=right | 1.1 km || 
|-id=424 bgcolor=#E9E9E9
| 268424 ||  || — || October 22, 2005 || Catalina || CSS || — || align=right | 1.1 km || 
|-id=425 bgcolor=#fefefe
| 268425 ||  || — || October 23, 2005 || Palomar || NEAT || — || align=right | 1.4 km || 
|-id=426 bgcolor=#E9E9E9
| 268426 ||  || — || October 25, 2005 || Catalina || CSS || — || align=right | 1.9 km || 
|-id=427 bgcolor=#d6d6d6
| 268427 ||  || — || October 24, 2005 || Mauna Kea || D. J. Tholen || — || align=right | 3.7 km || 
|-id=428 bgcolor=#E9E9E9
| 268428 ||  || — || October 24, 2005 || Kitt Peak || Spacewatch || — || align=right data-sort-value="0.99" | 990 m || 
|-id=429 bgcolor=#E9E9E9
| 268429 ||  || — || October 27, 2005 || Mount Lemmon || Mount Lemmon Survey || — || align=right | 1.4 km || 
|-id=430 bgcolor=#E9E9E9
| 268430 ||  || — || October 30, 2005 || Kitt Peak || Spacewatch || — || align=right | 1.3 km || 
|-id=431 bgcolor=#E9E9E9
| 268431 ||  || — || November 6, 2005 || Kitt Peak || Spacewatch || — || align=right | 1.7 km || 
|-id=432 bgcolor=#E9E9E9
| 268432 ||  || — || November 2, 2005 || Socorro || LINEAR || — || align=right | 1.7 km || 
|-id=433 bgcolor=#E9E9E9
| 268433 ||  || — || November 3, 2005 || Mount Lemmon || Mount Lemmon Survey || HNA || align=right | 2.6 km || 
|-id=434 bgcolor=#E9E9E9
| 268434 ||  || — || November 5, 2005 || Catalina || CSS || — || align=right | 1.5 km || 
|-id=435 bgcolor=#E9E9E9
| 268435 ||  || — || November 1, 2005 || Socorro || LINEAR || — || align=right | 2.4 km || 
|-id=436 bgcolor=#E9E9E9
| 268436 ||  || — || November 3, 2005 || Mount Lemmon || Mount Lemmon Survey || — || align=right | 1.3 km || 
|-id=437 bgcolor=#E9E9E9
| 268437 ||  || — || November 3, 2005 || Kitt Peak || Spacewatch || — || align=right | 1.4 km || 
|-id=438 bgcolor=#E9E9E9
| 268438 ||  || — || November 6, 2005 || Kitt Peak || Spacewatch || — || align=right | 1.4 km || 
|-id=439 bgcolor=#E9E9E9
| 268439 ||  || — || November 10, 2005 || Catalina || CSS || — || align=right | 1.4 km || 
|-id=440 bgcolor=#E9E9E9
| 268440 ||  || — || November 6, 2005 || Mount Lemmon || Mount Lemmon Survey || — || align=right | 1.3 km || 
|-id=441 bgcolor=#E9E9E9
| 268441 ||  || — || November 1, 2005 || Apache Point || A. C. Becker || — || align=right | 1.1 km || 
|-id=442 bgcolor=#E9E9E9
| 268442 ||  || — || November 21, 2005 || Kitt Peak || Spacewatch || — || align=right | 1.1 km || 
|-id=443 bgcolor=#E9E9E9
| 268443 ||  || — || November 21, 2005 || Kitt Peak || Spacewatch || — || align=right | 2.1 km || 
|-id=444 bgcolor=#E9E9E9
| 268444 ||  || — || November 21, 2005 || Kitt Peak || Spacewatch || — || align=right | 1.5 km || 
|-id=445 bgcolor=#E9E9E9
| 268445 ||  || — || November 22, 2005 || Kitt Peak || Spacewatch || — || align=right | 1.8 km || 
|-id=446 bgcolor=#E9E9E9
| 268446 ||  || — || November 22, 2005 || Kitt Peak || Spacewatch || — || align=right | 1.5 km || 
|-id=447 bgcolor=#E9E9E9
| 268447 ||  || — || November 22, 2005 || Kitt Peak || Spacewatch || — || align=right | 2.0 km || 
|-id=448 bgcolor=#E9E9E9
| 268448 ||  || — || November 25, 2005 || Kitt Peak || Spacewatch || — || align=right | 1.5 km || 
|-id=449 bgcolor=#E9E9E9
| 268449 ||  || — || November 25, 2005 || Kitt Peak || Spacewatch || MIS || align=right | 2.3 km || 
|-id=450 bgcolor=#E9E9E9
| 268450 ||  || — || November 25, 2005 || Kitt Peak || Spacewatch || — || align=right | 2.1 km || 
|-id=451 bgcolor=#E9E9E9
| 268451 ||  || — || November 25, 2005 || Mount Lemmon || Mount Lemmon Survey || RAF || align=right | 1.1 km || 
|-id=452 bgcolor=#E9E9E9
| 268452 ||  || — || November 26, 2005 || Kitt Peak || Spacewatch || — || align=right | 1.2 km || 
|-id=453 bgcolor=#E9E9E9
| 268453 ||  || — || November 22, 2005 || Catalina || CSS || — || align=right | 1.7 km || 
|-id=454 bgcolor=#E9E9E9
| 268454 ||  || — || November 25, 2005 || Kitt Peak || Spacewatch || — || align=right | 3.1 km || 
|-id=455 bgcolor=#d6d6d6
| 268455 ||  || — || November 28, 2005 || Mount Lemmon || Mount Lemmon Survey || HIL3:2 || align=right | 6.3 km || 
|-id=456 bgcolor=#E9E9E9
| 268456 ||  || — || November 25, 2005 || Catalina || CSS || — || align=right | 3.0 km || 
|-id=457 bgcolor=#d6d6d6
| 268457 ||  || — || November 25, 2005 || Palomar || NEAT || EUP || align=right | 6.6 km || 
|-id=458 bgcolor=#E9E9E9
| 268458 ||  || — || November 30, 2005 || Socorro || LINEAR || GEF || align=right | 1.5 km || 
|-id=459 bgcolor=#E9E9E9
| 268459 ||  || — || November 28, 2005 || Socorro || LINEAR || — || align=right | 2.4 km || 
|-id=460 bgcolor=#fefefe
| 268460 ||  || — || November 30, 2005 || Socorro || LINEAR || NYS || align=right data-sort-value="0.80" | 800 m || 
|-id=461 bgcolor=#fefefe
| 268461 ||  || — || November 29, 2005 || Palomar || NEAT || V || align=right | 1.2 km || 
|-id=462 bgcolor=#E9E9E9
| 268462 ||  || — || November 29, 2005 || Mount Lemmon || Mount Lemmon Survey || — || align=right | 1.2 km || 
|-id=463 bgcolor=#E9E9E9
| 268463 ||  || — || November 30, 2005 || Kitt Peak || Spacewatch || — || align=right | 1.7 km || 
|-id=464 bgcolor=#E9E9E9
| 268464 ||  || — || November 22, 2005 || Catalina || CSS || — || align=right | 2.9 km || 
|-id=465 bgcolor=#E9E9E9
| 268465 ||  || — || November 28, 2005 || Catalina || CSS || — || align=right | 2.7 km || 
|-id=466 bgcolor=#E9E9E9
| 268466 ||  || — || November 20, 2005 || Catalina || CSS || GEF || align=right | 1.5 km || 
|-id=467 bgcolor=#E9E9E9
| 268467 ||  || — || November 25, 2005 || Mount Lemmon || Mount Lemmon Survey || AGN || align=right | 1.6 km || 
|-id=468 bgcolor=#E9E9E9
| 268468 ||  || — || November 26, 2005 || Mount Lemmon || Mount Lemmon Survey || MIS || align=right | 2.3 km || 
|-id=469 bgcolor=#E9E9E9
| 268469 ||  || — || November 25, 2005 || Mount Lemmon || Mount Lemmon Survey || WIT || align=right | 1.6 km || 
|-id=470 bgcolor=#E9E9E9
| 268470 ||  || — || December 2, 2005 || Kitt Peak || Spacewatch || — || align=right | 1.6 km || 
|-id=471 bgcolor=#E9E9E9
| 268471 ||  || — || December 2, 2005 || Socorro || LINEAR || — || align=right | 1.6 km || 
|-id=472 bgcolor=#E9E9E9
| 268472 ||  || — || December 1, 2005 || Kitt Peak || Spacewatch || — || align=right | 1.8 km || 
|-id=473 bgcolor=#E9E9E9
| 268473 ||  || — || December 2, 2005 || Kitt Peak || Spacewatch || NEM || align=right | 2.5 km || 
|-id=474 bgcolor=#E9E9E9
| 268474 ||  || — || December 2, 2005 || Kitt Peak || Spacewatch || — || align=right | 2.8 km || 
|-id=475 bgcolor=#E9E9E9
| 268475 ||  || — || December 2, 2005 || Kitt Peak || Spacewatch || — || align=right | 1.9 km || 
|-id=476 bgcolor=#E9E9E9
| 268476 ||  || — || December 2, 2005 || Kitt Peak || Spacewatch || — || align=right | 2.0 km || 
|-id=477 bgcolor=#E9E9E9
| 268477 ||  || — || December 3, 2005 || Kitt Peak || Spacewatch || — || align=right | 1.4 km || 
|-id=478 bgcolor=#E9E9E9
| 268478 ||  || — || December 3, 2005 || Kitt Peak || Spacewatch || — || align=right | 2.2 km || 
|-id=479 bgcolor=#E9E9E9
| 268479 ||  || — || December 4, 2005 || Kitt Peak || Spacewatch || — || align=right | 2.0 km || 
|-id=480 bgcolor=#E9E9E9
| 268480 ||  || — || December 5, 2005 || Mount Lemmon || Mount Lemmon Survey || — || align=right | 1.8 km || 
|-id=481 bgcolor=#E9E9E9
| 268481 ||  || — || December 7, 2005 || Socorro || LINEAR || — || align=right | 1.9 km || 
|-id=482 bgcolor=#E9E9E9
| 268482 ||  || — || December 6, 2005 || Kitt Peak || Spacewatch || RAF || align=right | 1.2 km || 
|-id=483 bgcolor=#E9E9E9
| 268483 ||  || — || December 6, 2005 || Kitt Peak || Spacewatch || — || align=right | 1.4 km || 
|-id=484 bgcolor=#d6d6d6
| 268484 ||  || — || December 6, 2005 || Kitt Peak || Spacewatch || — || align=right | 5.5 km || 
|-id=485 bgcolor=#E9E9E9
| 268485 ||  || — || December 7, 2005 || Kitt Peak || Spacewatch || GEF || align=right | 1.7 km || 
|-id=486 bgcolor=#E9E9E9
| 268486 ||  || — || December 1, 2005 || Anderson Mesa || LONEOS || — || align=right | 1.9 km || 
|-id=487 bgcolor=#E9E9E9
| 268487 ||  || — || December 8, 2005 || Socorro || LINEAR || — || align=right | 1.6 km || 
|-id=488 bgcolor=#E9E9E9
| 268488 || 2005 YO || — || December 20, 2005 || Calvin-Rehoboth || Calvin–Rehoboth Obs. || — || align=right | 2.6 km || 
|-id=489 bgcolor=#E9E9E9
| 268489 ||  || — || December 22, 2005 || Socorro || LINEAR || — || align=right | 2.2 km || 
|-id=490 bgcolor=#E9E9E9
| 268490 ||  || — || December 21, 2005 || Kitt Peak || Spacewatch || — || align=right | 1.6 km || 
|-id=491 bgcolor=#E9E9E9
| 268491 ||  || — || December 22, 2005 || Kitt Peak || Spacewatch || — || align=right | 2.4 km || 
|-id=492 bgcolor=#E9E9E9
| 268492 ||  || — || December 24, 2005 || Kitt Peak || Spacewatch || — || align=right | 1.5 km || 
|-id=493 bgcolor=#E9E9E9
| 268493 ||  || — || December 24, 2005 || Kitt Peak || Spacewatch || — || align=right | 1.7 km || 
|-id=494 bgcolor=#E9E9E9
| 268494 ||  || — || December 24, 2005 || Kitt Peak || Spacewatch || — || align=right | 2.0 km || 
|-id=495 bgcolor=#E9E9E9
| 268495 ||  || — || December 25, 2005 || Kitt Peak || Spacewatch || — || align=right | 2.6 km || 
|-id=496 bgcolor=#d6d6d6
| 268496 ||  || — || December 22, 2005 || Kitt Peak || Spacewatch || — || align=right | 2.8 km || 
|-id=497 bgcolor=#E9E9E9
| 268497 ||  || — || December 24, 2005 || Kitt Peak || Spacewatch || — || align=right | 2.6 km || 
|-id=498 bgcolor=#E9E9E9
| 268498 ||  || — || December 24, 2005 || Kitt Peak || Spacewatch || — || align=right | 2.2 km || 
|-id=499 bgcolor=#E9E9E9
| 268499 ||  || — || December 24, 2005 || Kitt Peak || Spacewatch || — || align=right | 2.5 km || 
|-id=500 bgcolor=#E9E9E9
| 268500 ||  || — || December 25, 2005 || Mount Lemmon || Mount Lemmon Survey || — || align=right | 2.8 km || 
|}

268501–268600 

|-bgcolor=#E9E9E9
| 268501 ||  || — || December 25, 2005 || Kitt Peak || Spacewatch || AGN || align=right | 1.5 km || 
|-id=502 bgcolor=#E9E9E9
| 268502 ||  || — || December 25, 2005 || Kitt Peak || Spacewatch || — || align=right | 2.2 km || 
|-id=503 bgcolor=#d6d6d6
| 268503 ||  || — || December 25, 2005 || Mount Lemmon || Mount Lemmon Survey || KOR || align=right | 2.0 km || 
|-id=504 bgcolor=#E9E9E9
| 268504 ||  || — || December 25, 2005 || Kitt Peak || Spacewatch || AGN || align=right | 1.4 km || 
|-id=505 bgcolor=#E9E9E9
| 268505 ||  || — || December 27, 2005 || Mount Lemmon || Mount Lemmon Survey || — || align=right | 2.0 km || 
|-id=506 bgcolor=#E9E9E9
| 268506 ||  || — || December 24, 2005 || Kitt Peak || Spacewatch || — || align=right | 2.3 km || 
|-id=507 bgcolor=#d6d6d6
| 268507 ||  || — || December 25, 2005 || Mount Lemmon || Mount Lemmon Survey || KOR || align=right | 1.5 km || 
|-id=508 bgcolor=#E9E9E9
| 268508 ||  || — || December 26, 2005 || Kitt Peak || Spacewatch || HNA || align=right | 2.4 km || 
|-id=509 bgcolor=#E9E9E9
| 268509 ||  || — || December 25, 2005 || Kitt Peak || Spacewatch || MIS || align=right | 2.7 km || 
|-id=510 bgcolor=#E9E9E9
| 268510 ||  || — || December 25, 2005 || Kitt Peak || Spacewatch || HEN || align=right | 1.4 km || 
|-id=511 bgcolor=#E9E9E9
| 268511 ||  || — || December 29, 2005 || Mount Lemmon || Mount Lemmon Survey || — || align=right | 2.0 km || 
|-id=512 bgcolor=#E9E9E9
| 268512 ||  || — || December 26, 2005 || Mount Lemmon || Mount Lemmon Survey || — || align=right | 3.1 km || 
|-id=513 bgcolor=#E9E9E9
| 268513 ||  || — || December 27, 2005 || Kitt Peak || Spacewatch || NEM || align=right | 3.1 km || 
|-id=514 bgcolor=#E9E9E9
| 268514 ||  || — || December 27, 2005 || Kitt Peak || Spacewatch || — || align=right | 2.1 km || 
|-id=515 bgcolor=#E9E9E9
| 268515 ||  || — || December 22, 2005 || Kitt Peak || Spacewatch || — || align=right | 2.1 km || 
|-id=516 bgcolor=#E9E9E9
| 268516 ||  || — || December 29, 2005 || Kitt Peak || Spacewatch || — || align=right | 2.0 km || 
|-id=517 bgcolor=#E9E9E9
| 268517 ||  || — || December 30, 2005 || Kitt Peak || Spacewatch || — || align=right | 2.1 km || 
|-id=518 bgcolor=#E9E9E9
| 268518 ||  || — || December 24, 2005 || Kitt Peak || Spacewatch || — || align=right | 1.8 km || 
|-id=519 bgcolor=#E9E9E9
| 268519 ||  || — || December 25, 2005 || Mount Lemmon || Mount Lemmon Survey || — || align=right | 2.3 km || 
|-id=520 bgcolor=#d6d6d6
| 268520 ||  || — || December 25, 2005 || Mount Lemmon || Mount Lemmon Survey || — || align=right | 2.5 km || 
|-id=521 bgcolor=#d6d6d6
| 268521 ||  || — || December 22, 2005 || Catalina || CSS || BRA || align=right | 2.3 km || 
|-id=522 bgcolor=#d6d6d6
| 268522 ||  || — || December 28, 2005 || Catalina || CSS || — || align=right | 2.7 km || 
|-id=523 bgcolor=#E9E9E9
| 268523 ||  || — || December 28, 2005 || Catalina || CSS || DOR || align=right | 2.8 km || 
|-id=524 bgcolor=#E9E9E9
| 268524 ||  || — || December 29, 2005 || Socorro || LINEAR || — || align=right | 3.3 km || 
|-id=525 bgcolor=#E9E9E9
| 268525 ||  || — || December 21, 2005 || Kitt Peak || Spacewatch || NEM || align=right | 3.0 km || 
|-id=526 bgcolor=#E9E9E9
| 268526 ||  || — || December 25, 2005 || Mount Lemmon || Mount Lemmon Survey || NEM || align=right | 3.0 km || 
|-id=527 bgcolor=#E9E9E9
| 268527 ||  || — || December 28, 2005 || Kitt Peak || Spacewatch || — || align=right | 2.6 km || 
|-id=528 bgcolor=#E9E9E9
| 268528 ||  || — || December 30, 2005 || Kitt Peak || Spacewatch || — || align=right | 2.1 km || 
|-id=529 bgcolor=#E9E9E9
| 268529 ||  || — || December 21, 2005 || Kitt Peak || Spacewatch || — || align=right | 1.8 km || 
|-id=530 bgcolor=#E9E9E9
| 268530 ||  || — || December 25, 2005 || Kitt Peak || Spacewatch || DOR || align=right | 4.0 km || 
|-id=531 bgcolor=#E9E9E9
| 268531 ||  || — || December 25, 2005 || Anderson Mesa || LONEOS || DOR || align=right | 3.2 km || 
|-id=532 bgcolor=#E9E9E9
| 268532 ||  || — || December 26, 2005 || Mount Lemmon || Mount Lemmon Survey || — || align=right | 2.3 km || 
|-id=533 bgcolor=#E9E9E9
| 268533 ||  || — || January 5, 2006 || Catalina || CSS || — || align=right | 3.0 km || 
|-id=534 bgcolor=#d6d6d6
| 268534 ||  || — || January 5, 2006 || Mount Lemmon || Mount Lemmon Survey || — || align=right | 3.8 km || 
|-id=535 bgcolor=#E9E9E9
| 268535 ||  || — || January 5, 2006 || Catalina || CSS || — || align=right | 2.9 km || 
|-id=536 bgcolor=#d6d6d6
| 268536 ||  || — || January 5, 2006 || Catalina || CSS || — || align=right | 3.9 km || 
|-id=537 bgcolor=#E9E9E9
| 268537 ||  || — || January 6, 2006 || Socorro || LINEAR || — || align=right | 2.6 km || 
|-id=538 bgcolor=#E9E9E9
| 268538 ||  || — || January 4, 2006 || Kitt Peak || Spacewatch || HEN || align=right | 1.2 km || 
|-id=539 bgcolor=#E9E9E9
| 268539 ||  || — || January 4, 2006 || Kitt Peak || Spacewatch || HOF || align=right | 2.8 km || 
|-id=540 bgcolor=#d6d6d6
| 268540 ||  || — || January 7, 2006 || Mount Lemmon || Mount Lemmon Survey || — || align=right | 3.5 km || 
|-id=541 bgcolor=#E9E9E9
| 268541 ||  || — || January 7, 2006 || Kitt Peak || Spacewatch || AGN || align=right | 1.1 km || 
|-id=542 bgcolor=#E9E9E9
| 268542 ||  || — || January 4, 2006 || Kitt Peak || Spacewatch || — || align=right | 1.5 km || 
|-id=543 bgcolor=#d6d6d6
| 268543 ||  || — || January 5, 2006 || Kitt Peak || Spacewatch || KOR || align=right | 1.5 km || 
|-id=544 bgcolor=#E9E9E9
| 268544 ||  || — || January 5, 2006 || Kitt Peak || Spacewatch || HEN || align=right data-sort-value="0.99" | 990 m || 
|-id=545 bgcolor=#E9E9E9
| 268545 ||  || — || January 5, 2006 || Kitt Peak || Spacewatch || — || align=right | 1.7 km || 
|-id=546 bgcolor=#E9E9E9
| 268546 ||  || — || January 7, 2006 || Mount Lemmon || Mount Lemmon Survey || HEN || align=right | 1.5 km || 
|-id=547 bgcolor=#d6d6d6
| 268547 ||  || — || January 8, 2006 || Mount Lemmon || Mount Lemmon Survey || — || align=right | 3.8 km || 
|-id=548 bgcolor=#E9E9E9
| 268548 ||  || — || January 7, 2006 || Socorro || LINEAR || — || align=right | 3.9 km || 
|-id=549 bgcolor=#E9E9E9
| 268549 ||  || — || January 5, 2006 || Mount Lemmon || Mount Lemmon Survey || — || align=right | 3.4 km || 
|-id=550 bgcolor=#E9E9E9
| 268550 ||  || — || January 5, 2006 || Kitt Peak || Spacewatch || — || align=right | 2.6 km || 
|-id=551 bgcolor=#d6d6d6
| 268551 ||  || — || January 8, 2006 || Mount Lemmon || Mount Lemmon Survey || — || align=right | 3.0 km || 
|-id=552 bgcolor=#d6d6d6
| 268552 ||  || — || January 22, 2006 || Junk Bond || D. Healy || — || align=right | 3.8 km || 
|-id=553 bgcolor=#E9E9E9
| 268553 ||  || — || January 22, 2006 || Mount Lemmon || Mount Lemmon Survey || — || align=right | 3.1 km || 
|-id=554 bgcolor=#E9E9E9
| 268554 ||  || — || January 22, 2006 || Mount Lemmon || Mount Lemmon Survey || — || align=right | 3.9 km || 
|-id=555 bgcolor=#E9E9E9
| 268555 ||  || — || January 20, 2006 || Kitt Peak || Spacewatch || — || align=right | 2.9 km || 
|-id=556 bgcolor=#E9E9E9
| 268556 ||  || — || January 20, 2006 || Kitt Peak || Spacewatch || HNA || align=right | 3.6 km || 
|-id=557 bgcolor=#d6d6d6
| 268557 ||  || — || January 20, 2006 || Kitt Peak || Spacewatch || — || align=right | 4.1 km || 
|-id=558 bgcolor=#d6d6d6
| 268558 ||  || — || January 21, 2006 || Kitt Peak || Spacewatch || — || align=right | 3.8 km || 
|-id=559 bgcolor=#d6d6d6
| 268559 ||  || — || January 21, 2006 || Kitt Peak || Spacewatch || — || align=right | 3.0 km || 
|-id=560 bgcolor=#d6d6d6
| 268560 ||  || — || January 23, 2006 || Kitt Peak || Spacewatch || — || align=right | 3.1 km || 
|-id=561 bgcolor=#E9E9E9
| 268561 ||  || — || January 24, 2006 || Mount Lemmon || Mount Lemmon Survey || — || align=right | 2.0 km || 
|-id=562 bgcolor=#d6d6d6
| 268562 ||  || — || January 20, 2006 || Kitt Peak || Spacewatch || KAR || align=right | 1.6 km || 
|-id=563 bgcolor=#E9E9E9
| 268563 ||  || — || January 23, 2006 || Mount Lemmon || Mount Lemmon Survey || NEM || align=right | 3.2 km || 
|-id=564 bgcolor=#E9E9E9
| 268564 ||  || — || January 25, 2006 || Kitt Peak || Spacewatch || — || align=right | 1.6 km || 
|-id=565 bgcolor=#E9E9E9
| 268565 ||  || — || January 25, 2006 || Kitt Peak || Spacewatch || AGN || align=right | 1.7 km || 
|-id=566 bgcolor=#E9E9E9
| 268566 ||  || — || January 25, 2006 || Kitt Peak || Spacewatch || — || align=right | 3.5 km || 
|-id=567 bgcolor=#E9E9E9
| 268567 ||  || — || January 22, 2006 || Mount Lemmon || Mount Lemmon Survey || MRX || align=right | 1.6 km || 
|-id=568 bgcolor=#d6d6d6
| 268568 ||  || — || January 23, 2006 || Kitt Peak || Spacewatch || KOR || align=right | 1.7 km || 
|-id=569 bgcolor=#d6d6d6
| 268569 ||  || — || January 25, 2006 || Kitt Peak || Spacewatch || CHA || align=right | 2.6 km || 
|-id=570 bgcolor=#d6d6d6
| 268570 ||  || — || January 25, 2006 || Kitt Peak || Spacewatch || 628 || align=right | 2.3 km || 
|-id=571 bgcolor=#E9E9E9
| 268571 ||  || — || January 26, 2006 || Socorro || LINEAR || — || align=right | 4.0 km || 
|-id=572 bgcolor=#d6d6d6
| 268572 ||  || — || January 26, 2006 || Kitt Peak || Spacewatch || K-2 || align=right | 1.8 km || 
|-id=573 bgcolor=#E9E9E9
| 268573 ||  || — || January 27, 2006 || Catalina || CSS || GEF || align=right | 1.6 km || 
|-id=574 bgcolor=#E9E9E9
| 268574 ||  || — || January 20, 2006 || Kitt Peak || Spacewatch || AGN || align=right | 1.6 km || 
|-id=575 bgcolor=#d6d6d6
| 268575 ||  || — || January 23, 2006 || Mount Lemmon || Mount Lemmon Survey || — || align=right | 3.5 km || 
|-id=576 bgcolor=#d6d6d6
| 268576 ||  || — || January 23, 2006 || Mount Lemmon || Mount Lemmon Survey || KOR || align=right | 1.4 km || 
|-id=577 bgcolor=#d6d6d6
| 268577 ||  || — || January 23, 2006 || Mount Lemmon || Mount Lemmon Survey || — || align=right | 3.4 km || 
|-id=578 bgcolor=#E9E9E9
| 268578 ||  || — || January 26, 2006 || Kitt Peak || Spacewatch || HOF || align=right | 3.9 km || 
|-id=579 bgcolor=#E9E9E9
| 268579 ||  || — || January 26, 2006 || Kitt Peak || Spacewatch || — || align=right | 3.3 km || 
|-id=580 bgcolor=#d6d6d6
| 268580 ||  || — || January 26, 2006 || Kitt Peak || Spacewatch || — || align=right | 2.2 km || 
|-id=581 bgcolor=#d6d6d6
| 268581 ||  || — || January 26, 2006 || Kitt Peak || Spacewatch || KOR || align=right | 1.5 km || 
|-id=582 bgcolor=#E9E9E9
| 268582 ||  || — || January 26, 2006 || Kitt Peak || Spacewatch || HOF || align=right | 4.7 km || 
|-id=583 bgcolor=#d6d6d6
| 268583 ||  || — || January 26, 2006 || Kitt Peak || Spacewatch || K-2 || align=right | 2.0 km || 
|-id=584 bgcolor=#E9E9E9
| 268584 ||  || — || January 23, 2006 || Catalina || CSS || — || align=right | 4.7 km || 
|-id=585 bgcolor=#fefefe
| 268585 ||  || — || January 23, 2006 || Catalina || CSS || H || align=right data-sort-value="0.86" | 860 m || 
|-id=586 bgcolor=#E9E9E9
| 268586 ||  || — || January 23, 2006 || Catalina || CSS || — || align=right | 3.6 km || 
|-id=587 bgcolor=#d6d6d6
| 268587 ||  || — || January 26, 2006 || Kitt Peak || Spacewatch || CHA || align=right | 2.6 km || 
|-id=588 bgcolor=#d6d6d6
| 268588 ||  || — || January 26, 2006 || Mount Lemmon || Mount Lemmon Survey || — || align=right | 3.7 km || 
|-id=589 bgcolor=#E9E9E9
| 268589 ||  || — || January 27, 2006 || Mount Lemmon || Mount Lemmon Survey || WIT || align=right | 1.8 km || 
|-id=590 bgcolor=#d6d6d6
| 268590 ||  || — || January 28, 2006 || Mount Lemmon || Mount Lemmon Survey || — || align=right | 2.5 km || 
|-id=591 bgcolor=#d6d6d6
| 268591 ||  || — || January 30, 2006 || Kitt Peak || Spacewatch || — || align=right | 2.5 km || 
|-id=592 bgcolor=#E9E9E9
| 268592 ||  || — || January 31, 2006 || Kitt Peak || Spacewatch || HOF || align=right | 3.4 km || 
|-id=593 bgcolor=#E9E9E9
| 268593 ||  || — || January 31, 2006 || Mount Lemmon || Mount Lemmon Survey || — || align=right | 2.6 km || 
|-id=594 bgcolor=#d6d6d6
| 268594 ||  || — || January 31, 2006 || Catalina || CSS || — || align=right | 3.7 km || 
|-id=595 bgcolor=#d6d6d6
| 268595 ||  || — || January 30, 2006 || Kitt Peak || Spacewatch || KOR || align=right | 1.8 km || 
|-id=596 bgcolor=#E9E9E9
| 268596 ||  || — || January 30, 2006 || Kitt Peak || Spacewatch || PAD || align=right | 2.4 km || 
|-id=597 bgcolor=#E9E9E9
| 268597 ||  || — || January 31, 2006 || Kitt Peak || Spacewatch || GEF || align=right | 2.1 km || 
|-id=598 bgcolor=#E9E9E9
| 268598 ||  || — || January 31, 2006 || Kitt Peak || Spacewatch || — || align=right | 4.5 km || 
|-id=599 bgcolor=#d6d6d6
| 268599 ||  || — || January 31, 2006 || Kitt Peak || Spacewatch || KOR || align=right | 1.7 km || 
|-id=600 bgcolor=#E9E9E9
| 268600 ||  || — || January 31, 2006 || Kitt Peak || Spacewatch || — || align=right | 2.6 km || 
|}

268601–268700 

|-bgcolor=#d6d6d6
| 268601 ||  || — || January 31, 2006 || Kitt Peak || Spacewatch || — || align=right | 4.4 km || 
|-id=602 bgcolor=#E9E9E9
| 268602 ||  || — || January 31, 2006 || Mount Lemmon || Mount Lemmon Survey || — || align=right | 2.3 km || 
|-id=603 bgcolor=#d6d6d6
| 268603 ||  || — || January 31, 2006 || Kitt Peak || Spacewatch || KOR || align=right | 1.5 km || 
|-id=604 bgcolor=#d6d6d6
| 268604 ||  || — || January 31, 2006 || Kitt Peak || Spacewatch || EOS || align=right | 2.7 km || 
|-id=605 bgcolor=#d6d6d6
| 268605 ||  || — || January 31, 2006 || Kitt Peak || Spacewatch || — || align=right | 3.5 km || 
|-id=606 bgcolor=#d6d6d6
| 268606 ||  || — || January 31, 2006 || Kitt Peak || Spacewatch || KAR || align=right | 1.5 km || 
|-id=607 bgcolor=#E9E9E9
| 268607 ||  || — || January 31, 2006 || Kitt Peak || Spacewatch || MRX || align=right | 1.6 km || 
|-id=608 bgcolor=#d6d6d6
| 268608 ||  || — || January 31, 2006 || Kitt Peak || Spacewatch || KOR || align=right | 2.0 km || 
|-id=609 bgcolor=#E9E9E9
| 268609 ||  || — || January 25, 2006 || Anderson Mesa || LONEOS || POS || align=right | 3.9 km || 
|-id=610 bgcolor=#d6d6d6
| 268610 ||  || — || January 22, 2006 || Mount Lemmon || Mount Lemmon Survey || — || align=right | 3.9 km || 
|-id=611 bgcolor=#E9E9E9
| 268611 ||  || — || February 2, 2006 || Kitt Peak || Spacewatch || WITfast? || align=right | 1.5 km || 
|-id=612 bgcolor=#d6d6d6
| 268612 ||  || — || February 2, 2006 || Kitt Peak || Spacewatch || — || align=right | 3.6 km || 
|-id=613 bgcolor=#d6d6d6
| 268613 ||  || — || February 2, 2006 || Kitt Peak || Spacewatch || — || align=right | 4.4 km || 
|-id=614 bgcolor=#E9E9E9
| 268614 ||  || — || February 3, 2006 || Kitt Peak || Spacewatch || — || align=right | 2.7 km || 
|-id=615 bgcolor=#E9E9E9
| 268615 ||  || — || February 4, 2006 || Kitt Peak || Spacewatch || — || align=right | 2.2 km || 
|-id=616 bgcolor=#E9E9E9
| 268616 ||  || — || February 2, 2006 || Kitt Peak || Spacewatch || GEF || align=right | 1.9 km || 
|-id=617 bgcolor=#d6d6d6
| 268617 ||  || — || February 4, 2006 || Mount Lemmon || Mount Lemmon Survey || — || align=right | 2.8 km || 
|-id=618 bgcolor=#d6d6d6
| 268618 ||  || — || February 7, 2006 || Mount Lemmon || Mount Lemmon Survey || — || align=right | 3.5 km || 
|-id=619 bgcolor=#d6d6d6
| 268619 ||  || — || February 7, 2006 || Mount Lemmon || Mount Lemmon Survey || THM || align=right | 2.4 km || 
|-id=620 bgcolor=#d6d6d6
| 268620 ||  || — || February 20, 2006 || Catalina || CSS || EOS || align=right | 2.6 km || 
|-id=621 bgcolor=#d6d6d6
| 268621 ||  || — || February 20, 2006 || Catalina || CSS || KOR || align=right | 2.4 km || 
|-id=622 bgcolor=#d6d6d6
| 268622 ||  || — || February 20, 2006 || Catalina || CSS || — || align=right | 2.6 km || 
|-id=623 bgcolor=#d6d6d6
| 268623 ||  || — || February 20, 2006 || Kitt Peak || Spacewatch || KOR || align=right | 2.3 km || 
|-id=624 bgcolor=#d6d6d6
| 268624 ||  || — || February 20, 2006 || Kitt Peak || Spacewatch || — || align=right | 3.5 km || 
|-id=625 bgcolor=#d6d6d6
| 268625 ||  || — || February 20, 2006 || Kitt Peak || Spacewatch || — || align=right | 5.0 km || 
|-id=626 bgcolor=#d6d6d6
| 268626 ||  || — || February 20, 2006 || Kitt Peak || Spacewatch || THM || align=right | 3.0 km || 
|-id=627 bgcolor=#d6d6d6
| 268627 ||  || — || February 20, 2006 || Kitt Peak || Spacewatch || — || align=right | 5.1 km || 
|-id=628 bgcolor=#d6d6d6
| 268628 ||  || — || February 20, 2006 || Kitt Peak || Spacewatch || KOR || align=right | 2.1 km || 
|-id=629 bgcolor=#d6d6d6
| 268629 ||  || — || February 20, 2006 || Kitt Peak || Spacewatch || — || align=right | 2.7 km || 
|-id=630 bgcolor=#d6d6d6
| 268630 ||  || — || February 20, 2006 || Kitt Peak || Spacewatch || — || align=right | 2.7 km || 
|-id=631 bgcolor=#d6d6d6
| 268631 ||  || — || February 20, 2006 || Mount Lemmon || Mount Lemmon Survey || KAR || align=right | 1.2 km || 
|-id=632 bgcolor=#d6d6d6
| 268632 ||  || — || February 24, 2006 || Mount Lemmon || Mount Lemmon Survey || — || align=right | 3.8 km || 
|-id=633 bgcolor=#d6d6d6
| 268633 ||  || — || February 20, 2006 || Kitt Peak || Spacewatch || EOS || align=right | 2.3 km || 
|-id=634 bgcolor=#d6d6d6
| 268634 ||  || — || February 24, 2006 || Kitt Peak || Spacewatch || — || align=right | 3.0 km || 
|-id=635 bgcolor=#d6d6d6
| 268635 ||  || — || February 24, 2006 || Kitt Peak || Spacewatch || — || align=right | 3.1 km || 
|-id=636 bgcolor=#d6d6d6
| 268636 ||  || — || February 25, 2006 || Kitt Peak || Spacewatch || KOR || align=right | 1.8 km || 
|-id=637 bgcolor=#d6d6d6
| 268637 ||  || — || February 25, 2006 || Mount Lemmon || Mount Lemmon Survey || — || align=right | 4.8 km || 
|-id=638 bgcolor=#d6d6d6
| 268638 ||  || — || February 25, 2006 || Mount Lemmon || Mount Lemmon Survey || — || align=right | 5.1 km || 
|-id=639 bgcolor=#fefefe
| 268639 ||  || — || February 27, 2006 || Socorro || LINEAR || H || align=right data-sort-value="0.84" | 840 m || 
|-id=640 bgcolor=#d6d6d6
| 268640 ||  || — || February 27, 2006 || Kitt Peak || Spacewatch || AEG || align=right | 3.7 km || 
|-id=641 bgcolor=#E9E9E9
| 268641 ||  || — || February 27, 2006 || Catalina || CSS || INO || align=right | 2.2 km || 
|-id=642 bgcolor=#d6d6d6
| 268642 ||  || — || February 20, 2006 || Socorro || LINEAR || — || align=right | 4.5 km || 
|-id=643 bgcolor=#d6d6d6
| 268643 ||  || — || February 25, 2006 || Kitt Peak || Spacewatch || EOS || align=right | 1.9 km || 
|-id=644 bgcolor=#d6d6d6
| 268644 ||  || — || February 25, 2006 || Kitt Peak || Spacewatch || — || align=right | 3.6 km || 
|-id=645 bgcolor=#d6d6d6
| 268645 ||  || — || February 25, 2006 || Kitt Peak || Spacewatch || — || align=right | 3.7 km || 
|-id=646 bgcolor=#d6d6d6
| 268646 ||  || — || February 25, 2006 || Kitt Peak || Spacewatch || — || align=right | 3.1 km || 
|-id=647 bgcolor=#d6d6d6
| 268647 ||  || — || February 25, 2006 || Kitt Peak || Spacewatch || — || align=right | 3.1 km || 
|-id=648 bgcolor=#d6d6d6
| 268648 ||  || — || February 27, 2006 || Kitt Peak || Spacewatch || KOR || align=right | 1.5 km || 
|-id=649 bgcolor=#d6d6d6
| 268649 ||  || — || February 27, 2006 || Mount Lemmon || Mount Lemmon Survey || EOS || align=right | 3.9 km || 
|-id=650 bgcolor=#d6d6d6
| 268650 ||  || — || February 27, 2006 || Kitt Peak || Spacewatch || — || align=right | 2.8 km || 
|-id=651 bgcolor=#d6d6d6
| 268651 ||  || — || February 27, 2006 || Kitt Peak || Spacewatch || — || align=right | 4.0 km || 
|-id=652 bgcolor=#d6d6d6
| 268652 ||  || — || February 22, 2006 || Catalina || CSS || ALA || align=right | 6.3 km || 
|-id=653 bgcolor=#E9E9E9
| 268653 ||  || — || February 23, 2006 || Mount Lemmon || Mount Lemmon Survey || HOF || align=right | 3.3 km || 
|-id=654 bgcolor=#d6d6d6
| 268654 ||  || — || February 25, 2006 || Kitt Peak || Spacewatch || EOS || align=right | 2.6 km || 
|-id=655 bgcolor=#d6d6d6
| 268655 ||  || — || February 25, 2006 || Mount Lemmon || Mount Lemmon Survey || EOS || align=right | 3.1 km || 
|-id=656 bgcolor=#d6d6d6
| 268656 ||  || — || February 20, 2006 || Kitt Peak || Spacewatch || HYG || align=right | 4.1 km || 
|-id=657 bgcolor=#d6d6d6
| 268657 ||  || — || October 18, 2003 || Anderson Mesa || LONEOS || — || align=right | 3.5 km || 
|-id=658 bgcolor=#d6d6d6
| 268658 ||  || — || March 2, 2006 || Kitt Peak || Spacewatch || — || align=right | 2.8 km || 
|-id=659 bgcolor=#d6d6d6
| 268659 ||  || — || March 2, 2006 || Kitt Peak || Spacewatch || URS || align=right | 5.7 km || 
|-id=660 bgcolor=#d6d6d6
| 268660 ||  || — || March 3, 2006 || Kitt Peak || Spacewatch || — || align=right | 3.7 km || 
|-id=661 bgcolor=#d6d6d6
| 268661 ||  || — || March 3, 2006 || Kitt Peak || Spacewatch || KOR || align=right | 1.6 km || 
|-id=662 bgcolor=#d6d6d6
| 268662 ||  || — || March 3, 2006 || Kitt Peak || Spacewatch || EOS || align=right | 2.7 km || 
|-id=663 bgcolor=#d6d6d6
| 268663 ||  || — || March 3, 2006 || Mount Lemmon || Mount Lemmon Survey || — || align=right | 4.0 km || 
|-id=664 bgcolor=#d6d6d6
| 268664 ||  || — || March 4, 2006 || Catalina || CSS || — || align=right | 6.3 km || 
|-id=665 bgcolor=#d6d6d6
| 268665 ||  || — || March 5, 2006 || Kitt Peak || Spacewatch || — || align=right | 4.3 km || 
|-id=666 bgcolor=#d6d6d6
| 268666 ||  || — || March 5, 2006 || Kitt Peak || Spacewatch || — || align=right | 3.1 km || 
|-id=667 bgcolor=#d6d6d6
| 268667 ||  || — || March 5, 2006 || Kitt Peak || Spacewatch || EOS || align=right | 2.7 km || 
|-id=668 bgcolor=#d6d6d6
| 268668 ||  || — || March 4, 2006 || Kitt Peak || Spacewatch || — || align=right | 2.7 km || 
|-id=669 bgcolor=#d6d6d6
| 268669 Bunun ||  ||  || March 18, 2006 || Lulin Observatory || T.-C. Yang, Q.-z. Ye || — || align=right | 3.2 km || 
|-id=670 bgcolor=#d6d6d6
| 268670 ||  || — || March 23, 2006 || Kitt Peak || Spacewatch || THM || align=right | 2.8 km || 
|-id=671 bgcolor=#d6d6d6
| 268671 ||  || — || March 21, 2006 || Mount Lemmon || Mount Lemmon Survey || — || align=right | 4.4 km || 
|-id=672 bgcolor=#d6d6d6
| 268672 ||  || — || March 23, 2006 || Kitt Peak || Spacewatch || EMA || align=right | 4.3 km || 
|-id=673 bgcolor=#d6d6d6
| 268673 ||  || — || March 23, 2006 || Catalina || CSS || — || align=right | 3.4 km || 
|-id=674 bgcolor=#d6d6d6
| 268674 ||  || — || March 23, 2006 || Mount Lemmon || Mount Lemmon Survey || — || align=right | 3.9 km || 
|-id=675 bgcolor=#d6d6d6
| 268675 ||  || — || March 23, 2006 || Mount Lemmon || Mount Lemmon Survey || — || align=right | 5.3 km || 
|-id=676 bgcolor=#d6d6d6
| 268676 ||  || — || March 25, 2006 || Mount Lemmon || Mount Lemmon Survey || — || align=right | 2.9 km || 
|-id=677 bgcolor=#d6d6d6
| 268677 ||  || — || March 24, 2006 || Siding Spring || SSS || — || align=right | 5.3 km || 
|-id=678 bgcolor=#d6d6d6
| 268678 ||  || — || March 23, 2006 || Kitt Peak || Spacewatch || — || align=right | 3.6 km || 
|-id=679 bgcolor=#d6d6d6
| 268679 ||  || — || March 23, 2006 || Catalina || CSS || NAE || align=right | 4.7 km || 
|-id=680 bgcolor=#d6d6d6
| 268680 ||  || — || March 23, 2006 || Mount Lemmon || Mount Lemmon Survey || — || align=right | 5.0 km || 
|-id=681 bgcolor=#d6d6d6
| 268681 ||  || — || March 24, 2006 || Anderson Mesa || LONEOS || — || align=right | 3.5 km || 
|-id=682 bgcolor=#d6d6d6
| 268682 ||  || — || March 25, 2006 || Catalina || CSS || EUP || align=right | 6.1 km || 
|-id=683 bgcolor=#d6d6d6
| 268683 ||  || — || March 26, 2006 || Siding Spring || SSS || — || align=right | 6.0 km || 
|-id=684 bgcolor=#d6d6d6
| 268684 ||  || — || March 25, 2006 || Kitt Peak || Spacewatch || HYG || align=right | 3.3 km || 
|-id=685 bgcolor=#d6d6d6
| 268685 ||  || — || March 26, 2006 || Mount Lemmon || Mount Lemmon Survey || — || align=right | 3.4 km || 
|-id=686 bgcolor=#d6d6d6
| 268686 Elenaaprile || 2006 GW ||  || April 2, 2006 || Vallemare di Borbona || V. S. Casulli || EOS || align=right | 2.4 km || 
|-id=687 bgcolor=#d6d6d6
| 268687 ||  || — || April 2, 2006 || Mount Lemmon || Mount Lemmon Survey || — || align=right | 4.3 km || 
|-id=688 bgcolor=#d6d6d6
| 268688 ||  || — || April 2, 2006 || Kitt Peak || Spacewatch || — || align=right | 4.4 km || 
|-id=689 bgcolor=#d6d6d6
| 268689 ||  || — || April 2, 2006 || Kitt Peak || Spacewatch || — || align=right | 3.9 km || 
|-id=690 bgcolor=#d6d6d6
| 268690 ||  || — || April 2, 2006 || Kitt Peak || Spacewatch || THM || align=right | 2.8 km || 
|-id=691 bgcolor=#d6d6d6
| 268691 ||  || — || April 2, 2006 || Kitt Peak || Spacewatch || HYG || align=right | 4.0 km || 
|-id=692 bgcolor=#d6d6d6
| 268692 ||  || — || April 7, 2006 || Catalina || CSS || ALA || align=right | 6.8 km || 
|-id=693 bgcolor=#d6d6d6
| 268693 ||  || — || April 6, 2006 || Catalina || CSS || — || align=right | 5.6 km || 
|-id=694 bgcolor=#d6d6d6
| 268694 ||  || — || April 8, 2006 || Kitt Peak || Spacewatch || — || align=right | 5.2 km || 
|-id=695 bgcolor=#d6d6d6
| 268695 ||  || — || April 9, 2006 || Kitt Peak || Spacewatch || THM || align=right | 2.7 km || 
|-id=696 bgcolor=#d6d6d6
| 268696 ||  || — || April 1, 2006 || Siding Spring || SSS || — || align=right | 4.6 km || 
|-id=697 bgcolor=#d6d6d6
| 268697 ||  || — || April 7, 2006 || Catalina || CSS || — || align=right | 4.1 km || 
|-id=698 bgcolor=#d6d6d6
| 268698 ||  || — || April 7, 2006 || Siding Spring || SSS || — || align=right | 4.7 km || 
|-id=699 bgcolor=#d6d6d6
| 268699 ||  || — || April 19, 2006 || Mount Lemmon || Mount Lemmon Survey || KOR || align=right | 2.0 km || 
|-id=700 bgcolor=#d6d6d6
| 268700 ||  || — || April 18, 2006 || Anderson Mesa || LONEOS || — || align=right | 4.6 km || 
|}

268701–268800 

|-bgcolor=#d6d6d6
| 268701 ||  || — || April 19, 2006 || Kitt Peak || Spacewatch || — || align=right | 4.2 km || 
|-id=702 bgcolor=#d6d6d6
| 268702 ||  || — || April 20, 2006 || Kitt Peak || Spacewatch || HYG || align=right | 3.1 km || 
|-id=703 bgcolor=#d6d6d6
| 268703 ||  || — || April 20, 2006 || Anderson Mesa || LONEOS || — || align=right | 3.7 km || 
|-id=704 bgcolor=#d6d6d6
| 268704 ||  || — || April 19, 2006 || Mount Lemmon || Mount Lemmon Survey || — || align=right | 4.7 km || 
|-id=705 bgcolor=#d6d6d6
| 268705 ||  || — || April 20, 2006 || Kitt Peak || Spacewatch || — || align=right | 3.9 km || 
|-id=706 bgcolor=#d6d6d6
| 268706 ||  || — || April 20, 2006 || Kitt Peak || Spacewatch || EOS || align=right | 2.9 km || 
|-id=707 bgcolor=#d6d6d6
| 268707 ||  || — || April 20, 2006 || Kitt Peak || Spacewatch || — || align=right | 6.0 km || 
|-id=708 bgcolor=#d6d6d6
| 268708 ||  || — || April 19, 2006 || Kitt Peak || Spacewatch || — || align=right | 4.3 km || 
|-id=709 bgcolor=#d6d6d6
| 268709 ||  || — || April 19, 2006 || Mount Lemmon || Mount Lemmon Survey || — || align=right | 4.2 km || 
|-id=710 bgcolor=#d6d6d6
| 268710 ||  || — || April 21, 2006 || Mount Lemmon || Mount Lemmon Survey || — || align=right | 3.4 km || 
|-id=711 bgcolor=#d6d6d6
| 268711 ||  || — || April 24, 2006 || Mount Lemmon || Mount Lemmon Survey || HYG || align=right | 3.9 km || 
|-id=712 bgcolor=#d6d6d6
| 268712 ||  || — || April 25, 2006 || Catalina || CSS || VER || align=right | 3.4 km || 
|-id=713 bgcolor=#d6d6d6
| 268713 ||  || — || April 24, 2006 || Kitt Peak || Spacewatch || — || align=right | 4.6 km || 
|-id=714 bgcolor=#d6d6d6
| 268714 ||  || — || April 24, 2006 || Reedy Creek || J. Broughton || — || align=right | 4.4 km || 
|-id=715 bgcolor=#d6d6d6
| 268715 ||  || — || April 19, 2006 || Catalina || CSS || — || align=right | 5.1 km || 
|-id=716 bgcolor=#d6d6d6
| 268716 ||  || — || April 18, 2006 || Catalina || CSS || EUP || align=right | 6.3 km || 
|-id=717 bgcolor=#d6d6d6
| 268717 ||  || — || April 27, 2006 || Catalina || CSS || — || align=right | 3.8 km || 
|-id=718 bgcolor=#d6d6d6
| 268718 ||  || — || April 24, 2006 || Kitt Peak || Spacewatch || — || align=right | 4.1 km || 
|-id=719 bgcolor=#d6d6d6
| 268719 ||  || — || April 25, 2006 || Kitt Peak || Spacewatch || — || align=right | 3.0 km || 
|-id=720 bgcolor=#d6d6d6
| 268720 ||  || — || April 25, 2006 || Kitt Peak || Spacewatch || — || align=right | 2.9 km || 
|-id=721 bgcolor=#d6d6d6
| 268721 ||  || — || April 25, 2006 || Kitt Peak || Spacewatch || LIX || align=right | 4.4 km || 
|-id=722 bgcolor=#d6d6d6
| 268722 ||  || — || April 27, 2006 || Kitt Peak || Spacewatch || THM || align=right | 2.9 km || 
|-id=723 bgcolor=#d6d6d6
| 268723 ||  || — || April 26, 2006 || Anderson Mesa || LONEOS || — || align=right | 5.3 km || 
|-id=724 bgcolor=#d6d6d6
| 268724 ||  || — || April 26, 2006 || Kitt Peak || Spacewatch || — || align=right | 3.5 km || 
|-id=725 bgcolor=#d6d6d6
| 268725 ||  || — || April 26, 2006 || Cerro Tololo || M. W. Buie || 637 || align=right | 2.6 km || 
|-id=726 bgcolor=#d6d6d6
| 268726 ||  || — || April 26, 2006 || Cerro Tololo || M. W. Buie || — || align=right | 4.3 km || 
|-id=727 bgcolor=#d6d6d6
| 268727 ||  || — || May 2, 2006 || Kitt Peak || Spacewatch || SYL7:4 || align=right | 6.8 km || 
|-id=728 bgcolor=#d6d6d6
| 268728 ||  || — || May 6, 2006 || Mount Lemmon || Mount Lemmon Survey || — || align=right | 3.9 km || 
|-id=729 bgcolor=#fefefe
| 268729 ||  || — || May 2, 2006 || Catalina || CSS || H || align=right data-sort-value="0.71" | 710 m || 
|-id=730 bgcolor=#d6d6d6
| 268730 ||  || — || May 19, 2006 || Mount Lemmon || Mount Lemmon Survey || — || align=right | 4.4 km || 
|-id=731 bgcolor=#d6d6d6
| 268731 ||  || — || May 19, 2006 || Mount Lemmon || Mount Lemmon Survey || THM || align=right | 3.2 km || 
|-id=732 bgcolor=#fefefe
| 268732 ||  || — || May 20, 2006 || Palomar || NEAT || CIM || align=right | 2.6 km || 
|-id=733 bgcolor=#d6d6d6
| 268733 ||  || — || May 20, 2006 || Palomar || NEAT || — || align=right | 3.8 km || 
|-id=734 bgcolor=#d6d6d6
| 268734 ||  || — || May 23, 2006 || Kitt Peak || Spacewatch || — || align=right | 5.8 km || 
|-id=735 bgcolor=#d6d6d6
| 268735 ||  || — || May 21, 2006 || Kitt Peak || Spacewatch || TIR || align=right | 4.0 km || 
|-id=736 bgcolor=#d6d6d6
| 268736 ||  || — || May 23, 2006 || Kitt Peak || Spacewatch || — || align=right | 5.7 km || 
|-id=737 bgcolor=#d6d6d6
| 268737 ||  || — || May 23, 2006 || Kitt Peak || Spacewatch || — || align=right | 4.2 km || 
|-id=738 bgcolor=#fefefe
| 268738 ||  || — || May 26, 2006 || Kitt Peak || Spacewatch || H || align=right data-sort-value="0.78" | 780 m || 
|-id=739 bgcolor=#d6d6d6
| 268739 ||  || — || May 28, 2006 || Kitt Peak || Spacewatch || — || align=right | 5.5 km || 
|-id=740 bgcolor=#d6d6d6
| 268740 ||  || — || May 31, 2006 || Mount Lemmon || Mount Lemmon Survey || — || align=right | 4.9 km || 
|-id=741 bgcolor=#fefefe
| 268741 ||  || — || May 24, 2006 || Catalina || CSS || H || align=right data-sort-value="0.89" | 890 m || 
|-id=742 bgcolor=#d6d6d6
| 268742 ||  || — || May 31, 2006 || Mount Lemmon || Mount Lemmon Survey || HYG || align=right | 3.1 km || 
|-id=743 bgcolor=#d6d6d6
| 268743 ||  || — || June 5, 2006 || Socorro || LINEAR || Tj (2.99) || align=right | 4.3 km || 
|-id=744 bgcolor=#d6d6d6
| 268744 ||  || — || June 16, 2006 || Kitt Peak || Spacewatch || EOS || align=right | 2.4 km || 
|-id=745 bgcolor=#fefefe
| 268745 ||  || — || August 12, 2006 || Palomar || NEAT || H || align=right data-sort-value="0.87" | 870 m || 
|-id=746 bgcolor=#fefefe
| 268746 ||  || — || August 17, 2006 || Palomar || NEAT || FLO || align=right | 1.1 km || 
|-id=747 bgcolor=#FA8072
| 268747 ||  || — || August 21, 2006 || Socorro || LINEAR || PHO || align=right | 1.2 km || 
|-id=748 bgcolor=#fefefe
| 268748 ||  || — || August 21, 2006 || Palomar || NEAT || H || align=right | 1.1 km || 
|-id=749 bgcolor=#fefefe
| 268749 ||  || — || August 27, 2006 || Kitt Peak || Spacewatch || — || align=right data-sort-value="0.79" | 790 m || 
|-id=750 bgcolor=#fefefe
| 268750 ||  || — || August 27, 2006 || Kitt Peak || Spacewatch || — || align=right data-sort-value="0.61" | 610 m || 
|-id=751 bgcolor=#fefefe
| 268751 ||  || — || August 22, 2006 || Palomar || NEAT || — || align=right data-sort-value="0.62" | 620 m || 
|-id=752 bgcolor=#fefefe
| 268752 ||  || — || August 30, 2006 || La Sagra || OAM Obs. || PHO || align=right | 3.0 km || 
|-id=753 bgcolor=#fefefe
| 268753 ||  || — || August 29, 2006 || Anderson Mesa || LONEOS || — || align=right | 1.0 km || 
|-id=754 bgcolor=#fefefe
| 268754 ||  || — || August 31, 2006 || Marly || Naef Obs. || — || align=right data-sort-value="0.87" | 870 m || 
|-id=755 bgcolor=#fefefe
| 268755 ||  || — || August 18, 2006 || Palomar || NEAT || — || align=right | 1.0 km || 
|-id=756 bgcolor=#fefefe
| 268756 ||  || — || September 15, 2006 || Goodricke-Pigott || R. A. Tucker || FLO || align=right data-sort-value="0.94" | 940 m || 
|-id=757 bgcolor=#fefefe
| 268757 ||  || — || September 14, 2006 || Kitt Peak || Spacewatch || — || align=right data-sort-value="0.86" | 860 m || 
|-id=758 bgcolor=#fefefe
| 268758 ||  || — || September 15, 2006 || Kitt Peak || Spacewatch || — || align=right data-sort-value="0.84" | 840 m || 
|-id=759 bgcolor=#fefefe
| 268759 ||  || — || September 15, 2006 || Kitt Peak || Spacewatch || — || align=right data-sort-value="0.58" | 580 m || 
|-id=760 bgcolor=#fefefe
| 268760 ||  || — || September 15, 2006 || Kitt Peak || Spacewatch || FLO || align=right data-sort-value="0.60" | 600 m || 
|-id=761 bgcolor=#fefefe
| 268761 ||  || — || September 16, 2006 || Palomar || NEAT || — || align=right data-sort-value="0.94" | 940 m || 
|-id=762 bgcolor=#fefefe
| 268762 ||  || — || September 17, 2006 || Kitt Peak || Spacewatch || — || align=right data-sort-value="0.92" | 920 m || 
|-id=763 bgcolor=#fefefe
| 268763 ||  || — || September 17, 2006 || Kitt Peak || Spacewatch || — || align=right | 1.0 km || 
|-id=764 bgcolor=#fefefe
| 268764 ||  || — || September 18, 2006 || Kitt Peak || Spacewatch || — || align=right data-sort-value="0.62" | 620 m || 
|-id=765 bgcolor=#fefefe
| 268765 ||  || — || September 24, 2006 || Kitt Peak || Spacewatch || NYS || align=right data-sort-value="0.59" | 590 m || 
|-id=766 bgcolor=#fefefe
| 268766 ||  || — || September 25, 2006 || Mount Lemmon || Mount Lemmon Survey || — || align=right data-sort-value="0.70" | 700 m || 
|-id=767 bgcolor=#fefefe
| 268767 ||  || — || September 26, 2006 || Kitt Peak || Spacewatch || — || align=right data-sort-value="0.89" | 890 m || 
|-id=768 bgcolor=#fefefe
| 268768 ||  || — || September 28, 2006 || Catalina || CSS || — || align=right data-sort-value="0.82" | 820 m || 
|-id=769 bgcolor=#fefefe
| 268769 ||  || — || September 27, 2006 || Kitt Peak || Spacewatch || FLO || align=right data-sort-value="0.78" | 780 m || 
|-id=770 bgcolor=#fefefe
| 268770 ||  || — || September 27, 2006 || Kitt Peak || Spacewatch || FLO || align=right data-sort-value="0.61" | 610 m || 
|-id=771 bgcolor=#fefefe
| 268771 ||  || — || September 27, 2006 || Kitt Peak || Spacewatch || FLO || align=right data-sort-value="0.67" | 670 m || 
|-id=772 bgcolor=#fefefe
| 268772 ||  || — || September 28, 2006 || Kitt Peak || Spacewatch || — || align=right | 1.2 km || 
|-id=773 bgcolor=#fefefe
| 268773 ||  || — || September 30, 2006 || Mount Lemmon || Mount Lemmon Survey || — || align=right data-sort-value="0.92" | 920 m || 
|-id=774 bgcolor=#fefefe
| 268774 ||  || — || September 28, 2006 || Mount Lemmon || Mount Lemmon Survey || — || align=right | 1.1 km || 
|-id=775 bgcolor=#fefefe
| 268775 ||  || — || September 30, 2006 || Apache Point || A. C. Becker || — || align=right data-sort-value="0.96" | 960 m || 
|-id=776 bgcolor=#fefefe
| 268776 ||  || — || October 10, 2006 || Palomar || NEAT || — || align=right data-sort-value="0.86" | 860 m || 
|-id=777 bgcolor=#fefefe
| 268777 ||  || — || October 11, 2006 || Kitt Peak || Spacewatch || FLO || align=right data-sort-value="0.70" | 700 m || 
|-id=778 bgcolor=#fefefe
| 268778 ||  || — || October 11, 2006 || Kitt Peak || Spacewatch || — || align=right data-sort-value="0.82" | 820 m || 
|-id=779 bgcolor=#fefefe
| 268779 ||  || — || October 12, 2006 || Kitt Peak || Spacewatch || — || align=right data-sort-value="0.90" | 900 m || 
|-id=780 bgcolor=#fefefe
| 268780 ||  || — || October 12, 2006 || Kitt Peak || Spacewatch || — || align=right data-sort-value="0.83" | 830 m || 
|-id=781 bgcolor=#fefefe
| 268781 ||  || — || October 12, 2006 || Kitt Peak || Spacewatch || NYS || align=right data-sort-value="0.65" | 650 m || 
|-id=782 bgcolor=#FA8072
| 268782 ||  || — || October 12, 2006 || Palomar || NEAT || — || align=right data-sort-value="0.77" | 770 m || 
|-id=783 bgcolor=#fefefe
| 268783 ||  || — || October 13, 2006 || Kitt Peak || Spacewatch || NYS || align=right data-sort-value="0.70" | 700 m || 
|-id=784 bgcolor=#fefefe
| 268784 ||  || — || October 11, 2006 || Palomar || NEAT || — || align=right data-sort-value="0.84" | 840 m || 
|-id=785 bgcolor=#fefefe
| 268785 ||  || — || October 13, 2006 || Kitt Peak || Spacewatch || — || align=right | 1.0 km || 
|-id=786 bgcolor=#fefefe
| 268786 ||  || — || October 13, 2006 || Kitt Peak || Spacewatch || — || align=right data-sort-value="0.75" | 750 m || 
|-id=787 bgcolor=#fefefe
| 268787 ||  || — || October 13, 2006 || Kitt Peak || Spacewatch || — || align=right | 1.0 km || 
|-id=788 bgcolor=#fefefe
| 268788 ||  || — || October 15, 2006 || Kitt Peak || Spacewatch || FLO || align=right data-sort-value="0.61" | 610 m || 
|-id=789 bgcolor=#fefefe
| 268789 ||  || — || October 15, 2006 || San Marcello || Pistoia Mountains Obs. || — || align=right data-sort-value="0.98" | 980 m || 
|-id=790 bgcolor=#fefefe
| 268790 ||  || — || October 15, 2006 || Kitt Peak || Spacewatch || — || align=right data-sort-value="0.86" | 860 m || 
|-id=791 bgcolor=#fefefe
| 268791 ||  || — || October 16, 2006 || Kitt Peak || Spacewatch || — || align=right data-sort-value="0.72" | 720 m || 
|-id=792 bgcolor=#fefefe
| 268792 ||  || — || October 16, 2006 || Kitt Peak || Spacewatch || NYS || align=right data-sort-value="0.70" | 700 m || 
|-id=793 bgcolor=#fefefe
| 268793 ||  || — || October 16, 2006 || Kitt Peak || Spacewatch || — || align=right data-sort-value="0.83" | 830 m || 
|-id=794 bgcolor=#fefefe
| 268794 ||  || — || October 18, 2006 || Kitt Peak || Spacewatch || FLO || align=right data-sort-value="0.79" | 790 m || 
|-id=795 bgcolor=#fefefe
| 268795 ||  || — || October 19, 2006 || Kitt Peak || Spacewatch || — || align=right data-sort-value="0.80" | 800 m || 
|-id=796 bgcolor=#fefefe
| 268796 ||  || — || October 19, 2006 || Mount Lemmon || Mount Lemmon Survey || — || align=right data-sort-value="0.67" | 670 m || 
|-id=797 bgcolor=#fefefe
| 268797 ||  || — || October 16, 2006 || Catalina || CSS || FLO || align=right data-sort-value="0.77" | 770 m || 
|-id=798 bgcolor=#fefefe
| 268798 ||  || — || October 16, 2006 || Catalina || CSS || FLO || align=right data-sort-value="0.75" | 750 m || 
|-id=799 bgcolor=#d6d6d6
| 268799 ||  || — || October 19, 2006 || Catalina || CSS || URS || align=right | 5.7 km || 
|-id=800 bgcolor=#fefefe
| 268800 ||  || — || October 19, 2006 || Catalina || CSS || — || align=right | 1.1 km || 
|}

268801–268900 

|-bgcolor=#fefefe
| 268801 ||  || — || October 23, 2006 || Kitt Peak || Spacewatch || NYS || align=right data-sort-value="0.81" | 810 m || 
|-id=802 bgcolor=#fefefe
| 268802 ||  || — || October 19, 2006 || Catalina || CSS || — || align=right data-sort-value="0.92" | 920 m || 
|-id=803 bgcolor=#fefefe
| 268803 ||  || — || October 21, 2006 || Palomar || NEAT || — || align=right | 1.0 km || 
|-id=804 bgcolor=#fefefe
| 268804 ||  || — || October 27, 2006 || Mount Lemmon || Mount Lemmon Survey || — || align=right data-sort-value="0.57" | 570 m || 
|-id=805 bgcolor=#fefefe
| 268805 ||  || — || October 27, 2006 || Catalina || CSS || — || align=right data-sort-value="0.90" | 900 m || 
|-id=806 bgcolor=#fefefe
| 268806 ||  || — || October 22, 2006 || Kitt Peak || Spacewatch || — || align=right data-sort-value="0.75" | 750 m || 
|-id=807 bgcolor=#fefefe
| 268807 ||  || — || November 3, 2006 || Antares || ARO || — || align=right | 1.5 km || 
|-id=808 bgcolor=#fefefe
| 268808 ||  || — || November 9, 2006 || Kitt Peak || Spacewatch || — || align=right data-sort-value="0.99" | 990 m || 
|-id=809 bgcolor=#fefefe
| 268809 ||  || — || November 9, 2006 || Kitt Peak || Spacewatch || NYS || align=right data-sort-value="0.57" | 570 m || 
|-id=810 bgcolor=#fefefe
| 268810 ||  || — || November 9, 2006 || Kitt Peak || Spacewatch || — || align=right data-sort-value="0.98" | 980 m || 
|-id=811 bgcolor=#fefefe
| 268811 ||  || — || November 9, 2006 || Lulin Observatory || H.-C. Lin, Q.-z. Ye || NYS || align=right data-sort-value="0.78" | 780 m || 
|-id=812 bgcolor=#FA8072
| 268812 ||  || — || November 10, 2006 || Kitt Peak || Spacewatch || — || align=right | 1.0 km || 
|-id=813 bgcolor=#fefefe
| 268813 ||  || — || November 11, 2006 || Catalina || CSS || — || align=right data-sort-value="0.83" | 830 m || 
|-id=814 bgcolor=#fefefe
| 268814 ||  || — || November 14, 2006 || La Sagra || OAM Obs. || V || align=right data-sort-value="0.75" | 750 m || 
|-id=815 bgcolor=#fefefe
| 268815 ||  || — || November 10, 2006 || Kitt Peak || Spacewatch || NYS || align=right data-sort-value="0.64" | 640 m || 
|-id=816 bgcolor=#fefefe
| 268816 ||  || — || November 11, 2006 || Kitt Peak || Spacewatch || FLO || align=right data-sort-value="0.81" | 810 m || 
|-id=817 bgcolor=#fefefe
| 268817 ||  || — || November 11, 2006 || Kitt Peak || Spacewatch || — || align=right | 1.1 km || 
|-id=818 bgcolor=#fefefe
| 268818 ||  || — || November 11, 2006 || Kitt Peak || Spacewatch || — || align=right | 1.0 km || 
|-id=819 bgcolor=#fefefe
| 268819 ||  || — || November 11, 2006 || Kitt Peak || Spacewatch || V || align=right data-sort-value="0.92" | 920 m || 
|-id=820 bgcolor=#d6d6d6
| 268820 ||  || — || November 11, 2006 || Catalina || CSS || HYG || align=right | 5.2 km || 
|-id=821 bgcolor=#fefefe
| 268821 ||  || — || November 11, 2006 || Catalina || CSS || NYS || align=right data-sort-value="0.82" | 820 m || 
|-id=822 bgcolor=#fefefe
| 268822 ||  || — || November 11, 2006 || Kitt Peak || Spacewatch || — || align=right | 1.5 km || 
|-id=823 bgcolor=#fefefe
| 268823 ||  || — || November 13, 2006 || Kitt Peak || Spacewatch || V || align=right data-sort-value="0.92" | 920 m || 
|-id=824 bgcolor=#fefefe
| 268824 ||  || — || November 13, 2006 || Kitt Peak || Spacewatch || FLO || align=right data-sort-value="0.74" | 740 m || 
|-id=825 bgcolor=#fefefe
| 268825 ||  || — || November 14, 2006 || Kitt Peak || Spacewatch || — || align=right data-sort-value="0.80" | 800 m || 
|-id=826 bgcolor=#fefefe
| 268826 ||  || — || November 15, 2006 || Catalina || CSS || — || align=right | 1.1 km || 
|-id=827 bgcolor=#fefefe
| 268827 ||  || — || November 9, 2006 || Palomar || NEAT || — || align=right data-sort-value="0.84" | 840 m || 
|-id=828 bgcolor=#fefefe
| 268828 ||  || — || November 1, 2006 || Mount Lemmon || Mount Lemmon Survey || V || align=right data-sort-value="0.87" | 870 m || 
|-id=829 bgcolor=#fefefe
| 268829 ||  || — || November 16, 2006 || Socorro || LINEAR || — || align=right data-sort-value="0.86" | 860 m || 
|-id=830 bgcolor=#fefefe
| 268830 ||  || — || November 16, 2006 || Socorro || LINEAR || — || align=right | 1.1 km || 
|-id=831 bgcolor=#fefefe
| 268831 ||  || — || November 16, 2006 || Kitt Peak || Spacewatch || FLO || align=right data-sort-value="0.65" | 650 m || 
|-id=832 bgcolor=#fefefe
| 268832 ||  || — || November 16, 2006 || Kitt Peak || Spacewatch || NYS || align=right data-sort-value="0.77" | 770 m || 
|-id=833 bgcolor=#fefefe
| 268833 ||  || — || November 17, 2006 || Socorro || LINEAR || FLO || align=right data-sort-value="0.73" | 730 m || 
|-id=834 bgcolor=#fefefe
| 268834 ||  || — || November 17, 2006 || Mount Lemmon || Mount Lemmon Survey || — || align=right | 1.1 km || 
|-id=835 bgcolor=#fefefe
| 268835 ||  || — || November 18, 2006 || Kitt Peak || Spacewatch || V || align=right data-sort-value="0.87" | 870 m || 
|-id=836 bgcolor=#fefefe
| 268836 ||  || — || November 19, 2006 || Socorro || LINEAR || ERI || align=right | 2.1 km || 
|-id=837 bgcolor=#fefefe
| 268837 ||  || — || November 19, 2006 || Kitt Peak || Spacewatch || — || align=right data-sort-value="0.75" | 750 m || 
|-id=838 bgcolor=#fefefe
| 268838 ||  || — || November 19, 2006 || Kitt Peak || Spacewatch || MAS || align=right data-sort-value="0.94" | 940 m || 
|-id=839 bgcolor=#fefefe
| 268839 ||  || — || November 19, 2006 || Kitt Peak || Spacewatch || MAS || align=right data-sort-value="0.75" | 750 m || 
|-id=840 bgcolor=#fefefe
| 268840 ||  || — || November 22, 2006 || Catalina || CSS || — || align=right data-sort-value="0.87" | 870 m || 
|-id=841 bgcolor=#E9E9E9
| 268841 ||  || — || November 23, 2006 || Catalina || CSS || BAR || align=right | 1.8 km || 
|-id=842 bgcolor=#fefefe
| 268842 ||  || — || November 26, 2006 || 7300 Observatory || W. K. Y. Yeung || — || align=right data-sort-value="0.74" | 740 m || 
|-id=843 bgcolor=#fefefe
| 268843 ||  || — || November 21, 2006 || Mount Lemmon || Mount Lemmon Survey || NYS || align=right data-sort-value="0.88" | 880 m || 
|-id=844 bgcolor=#fefefe
| 268844 ||  || — || November 22, 2006 || Socorro || LINEAR || V || align=right data-sort-value="0.89" | 890 m || 
|-id=845 bgcolor=#fefefe
| 268845 ||  || — || November 23, 2006 || Kitt Peak || Spacewatch || NYS || align=right data-sort-value="0.64" | 640 m || 
|-id=846 bgcolor=#fefefe
| 268846 ||  || — || November 21, 2006 || Mount Lemmon || Mount Lemmon Survey || NYS || align=right data-sort-value="0.76" | 760 m || 
|-id=847 bgcolor=#fefefe
| 268847 ||  || — || December 12, 2006 || Great Shefford || P. Birtwhistle || — || align=right data-sort-value="0.73" | 730 m || 
|-id=848 bgcolor=#E9E9E9
| 268848 ||  || — || December 9, 2006 || Kitt Peak || Spacewatch || — || align=right | 1.9 km || 
|-id=849 bgcolor=#fefefe
| 268849 ||  || — || December 10, 2006 || Kitt Peak || Spacewatch || — || align=right data-sort-value="0.95" | 950 m || 
|-id=850 bgcolor=#fefefe
| 268850 ||  || — || December 12, 2006 || Socorro || LINEAR || V || align=right data-sort-value="0.82" | 820 m || 
|-id=851 bgcolor=#fefefe
| 268851 ||  || — || December 13, 2006 || Kitt Peak || Spacewatch || NYS || align=right data-sort-value="0.96" | 960 m || 
|-id=852 bgcolor=#fefefe
| 268852 ||  || — || December 13, 2006 || Catalina || CSS || — || align=right data-sort-value="0.98" | 980 m || 
|-id=853 bgcolor=#fefefe
| 268853 ||  || — || December 12, 2006 || Mount Lemmon || Mount Lemmon Survey || MAS || align=right data-sort-value="0.90" | 900 m || 
|-id=854 bgcolor=#fefefe
| 268854 ||  || — || December 13, 2006 || Mount Lemmon || Mount Lemmon Survey || ERI || align=right | 1.6 km || 
|-id=855 bgcolor=#fefefe
| 268855 ||  || — || December 13, 2006 || Mount Lemmon || Mount Lemmon Survey || — || align=right data-sort-value="0.98" | 980 m || 
|-id=856 bgcolor=#fefefe
| 268856 ||  || — || December 14, 2006 || Kitt Peak || Spacewatch || NYS || align=right data-sort-value="0.79" | 790 m || 
|-id=857 bgcolor=#fefefe
| 268857 ||  || — || December 15, 2006 || Kitt Peak || Spacewatch || MAS || align=right | 1.0 km || 
|-id=858 bgcolor=#fefefe
| 268858 ||  || — || December 12, 2006 || Palomar || NEAT || — || align=right data-sort-value="0.93" | 930 m || 
|-id=859 bgcolor=#fefefe
| 268859 ||  || — || December 12, 2006 || Kitt Peak || Spacewatch || FLO || align=right data-sort-value="0.64" | 640 m || 
|-id=860 bgcolor=#fefefe
| 268860 ||  || — || December 11, 2006 || Kitt Peak || Spacewatch || NYS || align=right data-sort-value="0.71" | 710 m || 
|-id=861 bgcolor=#fefefe
| 268861 ||  || — || December 13, 2006 || Catalina || CSS || — || align=right | 1.5 km || 
|-id=862 bgcolor=#fefefe
| 268862 ||  || — || December 17, 2006 || 7300 || W. K. Y. Yeung || NYS || align=right data-sort-value="0.78" | 780 m || 
|-id=863 bgcolor=#fefefe
| 268863 ||  || — || December 17, 2006 || Mount Lemmon || Mount Lemmon Survey || — || align=right data-sort-value="0.86" | 860 m || 
|-id=864 bgcolor=#fefefe
| 268864 ||  || — || December 21, 2006 || Palomar || NEAT || NYS || align=right data-sort-value="0.93" | 930 m || 
|-id=865 bgcolor=#fefefe
| 268865 ||  || — || December 24, 2006 || Kitt Peak || Spacewatch || NYS || align=right data-sort-value="0.93" | 930 m || 
|-id=866 bgcolor=#fefefe
| 268866 ||  || — || December 21, 2006 || Kitt Peak || Spacewatch || NYS || align=right data-sort-value="0.67" | 670 m || 
|-id=867 bgcolor=#fefefe
| 268867 ||  || — || December 21, 2006 || Kitt Peak || Spacewatch || — || align=right | 1.2 km || 
|-id=868 bgcolor=#fefefe
| 268868 ||  || — || December 21, 2006 || Kitt Peak || Spacewatch || MAS || align=right data-sort-value="0.84" | 840 m || 
|-id=869 bgcolor=#fefefe
| 268869 ||  || — || December 21, 2006 || Mount Lemmon || Mount Lemmon Survey || — || align=right | 1.1 km || 
|-id=870 bgcolor=#fefefe
| 268870 ||  || — || December 27, 2006 || Mount Lemmon || Mount Lemmon Survey || NYS || align=right data-sort-value="0.72" | 720 m || 
|-id=871 bgcolor=#fefefe
| 268871 ||  || — || January 8, 2007 || Mount Lemmon || Mount Lemmon Survey || NYS || align=right data-sort-value="0.86" | 860 m || 
|-id=872 bgcolor=#fefefe
| 268872 ||  || — || January 9, 2007 || Mount Lemmon || Mount Lemmon Survey || MAS || align=right data-sort-value="0.96" | 960 m || 
|-id=873 bgcolor=#fefefe
| 268873 ||  || — || January 14, 2007 || Altschwendt || W. Ries || NYS || align=right data-sort-value="0.91" | 910 m || 
|-id=874 bgcolor=#fefefe
| 268874 ||  || — || January 14, 2007 || Nyukasa || Mount Nyukasa Stn. || V || align=right data-sort-value="0.65" | 650 m || 
|-id=875 bgcolor=#E9E9E9
| 268875 ||  || — || January 10, 2007 || Mount Lemmon || Mount Lemmon Survey || — || align=right | 1.2 km || 
|-id=876 bgcolor=#fefefe
| 268876 ||  || — || January 15, 2007 || Anderson Mesa || LONEOS || NYS || align=right data-sort-value="0.76" | 760 m || 
|-id=877 bgcolor=#fefefe
| 268877 ||  || — || January 10, 2007 || Mount Lemmon || Mount Lemmon Survey || NYS || align=right data-sort-value="0.86" | 860 m || 
|-id=878 bgcolor=#fefefe
| 268878 ||  || — || January 10, 2007 || Mount Lemmon || Mount Lemmon Survey || — || align=right | 1.4 km || 
|-id=879 bgcolor=#E9E9E9
| 268879 ||  || — || January 15, 2007 || Catalina || CSS || — || align=right | 2.4 km || 
|-id=880 bgcolor=#fefefe
| 268880 ||  || — || January 10, 2007 || Mount Lemmon || Mount Lemmon Survey || NYS || align=right data-sort-value="0.79" | 790 m || 
|-id=881 bgcolor=#fefefe
| 268881 ||  || — || January 20, 2007 || Pla D'Arguines || R. Ferrando || — || align=right data-sort-value="0.93" | 930 m || 
|-id=882 bgcolor=#fefefe
| 268882 ||  || — || January 16, 2007 || Socorro || LINEAR || NYS || align=right data-sort-value="0.82" | 820 m || 
|-id=883 bgcolor=#fefefe
| 268883 ||  || — || January 16, 2007 || Socorro || LINEAR || MAS || align=right data-sort-value="0.94" | 940 m || 
|-id=884 bgcolor=#fefefe
| 268884 ||  || — || January 17, 2007 || Kitt Peak || Spacewatch || NYS || align=right data-sort-value="0.80" | 800 m || 
|-id=885 bgcolor=#fefefe
| 268885 ||  || — || January 17, 2007 || Kitt Peak || Spacewatch || V || align=right data-sort-value="0.93" | 930 m || 
|-id=886 bgcolor=#fefefe
| 268886 ||  || — || January 17, 2007 || Kitt Peak || Spacewatch || MAS || align=right data-sort-value="0.91" | 910 m || 
|-id=887 bgcolor=#fefefe
| 268887 ||  || — || January 17, 2007 || Palomar || NEAT || MAS || align=right data-sort-value="0.90" | 900 m || 
|-id=888 bgcolor=#fefefe
| 268888 ||  || — || January 24, 2007 || Mount Lemmon || Mount Lemmon Survey || NYS || align=right data-sort-value="0.96" | 960 m || 
|-id=889 bgcolor=#fefefe
| 268889 ||  || — || January 24, 2007 || Mount Lemmon || Mount Lemmon Survey || NYS || align=right data-sort-value="0.85" | 850 m || 
|-id=890 bgcolor=#fefefe
| 268890 ||  || — || January 24, 2007 || Mount Lemmon || Mount Lemmon Survey || NYS || align=right data-sort-value="0.72" | 720 m || 
|-id=891 bgcolor=#fefefe
| 268891 ||  || — || January 24, 2007 || Catalina || CSS || — || align=right | 1.2 km || 
|-id=892 bgcolor=#fefefe
| 268892 ||  || — || January 24, 2007 || Catalina || CSS || V || align=right data-sort-value="0.98" | 980 m || 
|-id=893 bgcolor=#fefefe
| 268893 ||  || — || January 24, 2007 || Socorro || LINEAR || — || align=right | 1.0 km || 
|-id=894 bgcolor=#fefefe
| 268894 ||  || — || January 24, 2007 || Mount Lemmon || Mount Lemmon Survey || — || align=right | 1.4 km || 
|-id=895 bgcolor=#fefefe
| 268895 ||  || — || January 24, 2007 || Mount Lemmon || Mount Lemmon Survey || NYS || align=right data-sort-value="0.71" | 710 m || 
|-id=896 bgcolor=#fefefe
| 268896 ||  || — || January 24, 2007 || Catalina || CSS || — || align=right | 1.1 km || 
|-id=897 bgcolor=#fefefe
| 268897 ||  || — || January 24, 2007 || Catalina || CSS || NYS || align=right data-sort-value="0.95" | 950 m || 
|-id=898 bgcolor=#fefefe
| 268898 ||  || — || January 25, 2007 || Kitt Peak || Spacewatch || — || align=right | 1.1 km || 
|-id=899 bgcolor=#fefefe
| 268899 ||  || — || January 26, 2007 || Goodricke-Pigott || R. A. Tucker || NYS || align=right data-sort-value="0.83" | 830 m || 
|-id=900 bgcolor=#fefefe
| 268900 ||  || — || January 24, 2007 || Socorro || LINEAR || NYS || align=right | 1.1 km || 
|}

268901–269000 

|-bgcolor=#fefefe
| 268901 ||  || — || January 24, 2007 || Socorro || LINEAR || NYS || align=right data-sort-value="0.92" | 920 m || 
|-id=902 bgcolor=#fefefe
| 268902 ||  || — || January 24, 2007 || Mount Lemmon || Mount Lemmon Survey || — || align=right | 1.1 km || 
|-id=903 bgcolor=#fefefe
| 268903 ||  || — || January 17, 2007 || Kitt Peak || Spacewatch || — || align=right data-sort-value="0.83" | 830 m || 
|-id=904 bgcolor=#fefefe
| 268904 ||  || — || January 17, 2007 || Kitt Peak || Spacewatch || V || align=right data-sort-value="0.79" | 790 m || 
|-id=905 bgcolor=#fefefe
| 268905 ||  || — || February 5, 2007 || Palomar || NEAT || — || align=right | 1.3 km || 
|-id=906 bgcolor=#fefefe
| 268906 ||  || — || February 6, 2007 || Mount Lemmon || Mount Lemmon Survey || V || align=right | 1.1 km || 
|-id=907 bgcolor=#fefefe
| 268907 ||  || — || February 6, 2007 || Mount Lemmon || Mount Lemmon Survey || MAS || align=right | 1.2 km || 
|-id=908 bgcolor=#fefefe
| 268908 ||  || — || February 6, 2007 || Kitt Peak || Spacewatch || MAS || align=right data-sort-value="0.88" | 880 m || 
|-id=909 bgcolor=#fefefe
| 268909 ||  || — || February 6, 2007 || Mount Lemmon || Mount Lemmon Survey || MAS || align=right data-sort-value="0.84" | 840 m || 
|-id=910 bgcolor=#fefefe
| 268910 ||  || — || February 6, 2007 || Palomar || NEAT || — || align=right | 1.3 km || 
|-id=911 bgcolor=#fefefe
| 268911 ||  || — || February 7, 2007 || Catalina || CSS || NYS || align=right data-sort-value="0.94" | 940 m || 
|-id=912 bgcolor=#fefefe
| 268912 ||  || — || February 6, 2007 || Palomar || NEAT || — || align=right | 1.0 km || 
|-id=913 bgcolor=#fefefe
| 268913 ||  || — || February 8, 2007 || Mount Lemmon || Mount Lemmon Survey || SUL || align=right | 1.8 km || 
|-id=914 bgcolor=#fefefe
| 268914 ||  || — || February 5, 2007 || Lulin || H.-C. Lin, Q.-z. Ye || NYS || align=right data-sort-value="0.86" | 860 m || 
|-id=915 bgcolor=#fefefe
| 268915 ||  || — || February 7, 2007 || Palomar || NEAT || — || align=right | 1.1 km || 
|-id=916 bgcolor=#fefefe
| 268916 ||  || — || February 8, 2007 || Kitt Peak || Spacewatch || NYS || align=right data-sort-value="0.70" | 700 m || 
|-id=917 bgcolor=#fefefe
| 268917 ||  || — || February 8, 2007 || Palomar || NEAT || NYS || align=right data-sort-value="0.82" | 820 m || 
|-id=918 bgcolor=#E9E9E9
| 268918 ||  || — || February 6, 2007 || Mount Lemmon || Mount Lemmon Survey || — || align=right | 1.1 km || 
|-id=919 bgcolor=#fefefe
| 268919 ||  || — || February 7, 2007 || Mount Lemmon || Mount Lemmon Survey || FLO || align=right | 1.5 km || 
|-id=920 bgcolor=#fefefe
| 268920 ||  || — || February 8, 2007 || Palomar || NEAT || CHL || align=right | 2.8 km || 
|-id=921 bgcolor=#fefefe
| 268921 ||  || — || February 8, 2007 || Palomar || NEAT || NYS || align=right data-sort-value="0.97" | 970 m || 
|-id=922 bgcolor=#fefefe
| 268922 ||  || — || February 8, 2007 || Palomar || NEAT || V || align=right data-sort-value="0.97" | 970 m || 
|-id=923 bgcolor=#E9E9E9
| 268923 ||  || — || February 8, 2007 || Palomar || NEAT || — || align=right | 1.4 km || 
|-id=924 bgcolor=#fefefe
| 268924 ||  || — || February 8, 2007 || Palomar || NEAT || MAS || align=right | 1.1 km || 
|-id=925 bgcolor=#fefefe
| 268925 ||  || — || February 8, 2007 || Palomar || NEAT || — || align=right | 1.3 km || 
|-id=926 bgcolor=#fefefe
| 268926 ||  || — || February 13, 2007 || Socorro || LINEAR || NYS || align=right data-sort-value="0.78" | 780 m || 
|-id=927 bgcolor=#fefefe
| 268927 ||  || — || February 16, 2007 || Mount Lemmon || Mount Lemmon Survey || — || align=right | 1.2 km || 
|-id=928 bgcolor=#fefefe
| 268928 ||  || — || February 16, 2007 || Mount Lemmon || Mount Lemmon Survey || — || align=right | 1.2 km || 
|-id=929 bgcolor=#fefefe
| 268929 ||  || — || February 17, 2007 || Kitt Peak || Spacewatch || NYS || align=right data-sort-value="0.74" | 740 m || 
|-id=930 bgcolor=#E9E9E9
| 268930 ||  || — || February 17, 2007 || Socorro || LINEAR || — || align=right | 4.5 km || 
|-id=931 bgcolor=#E9E9E9
| 268931 ||  || — || February 17, 2007 || Kitt Peak || Spacewatch || — || align=right | 1.3 km || 
|-id=932 bgcolor=#E9E9E9
| 268932 ||  || — || February 17, 2007 || Kitt Peak || Spacewatch || BRG || align=right | 1.5 km || 
|-id=933 bgcolor=#fefefe
| 268933 ||  || — || February 17, 2007 || Kitt Peak || Spacewatch || — || align=right | 1.3 km || 
|-id=934 bgcolor=#fefefe
| 268934 ||  || — || February 17, 2007 || Kitt Peak || Spacewatch || — || align=right data-sort-value="0.84" | 840 m || 
|-id=935 bgcolor=#E9E9E9
| 268935 ||  || — || February 17, 2007 || Kitt Peak || Spacewatch || — || align=right | 1.4 km || 
|-id=936 bgcolor=#E9E9E9
| 268936 ||  || — || February 17, 2007 || Kitt Peak || Spacewatch || — || align=right | 1.0 km || 
|-id=937 bgcolor=#E9E9E9
| 268937 ||  || — || February 17, 2007 || Kitt Peak || Spacewatch || — || align=right | 1.4 km || 
|-id=938 bgcolor=#E9E9E9
| 268938 ||  || — || February 17, 2007 || Kitt Peak || Spacewatch || EUN || align=right | 1.1 km || 
|-id=939 bgcolor=#fefefe
| 268939 ||  || — || February 17, 2007 || Kitt Peak || Spacewatch || — || align=right | 1.5 km || 
|-id=940 bgcolor=#E9E9E9
| 268940 ||  || — || February 17, 2007 || Kitt Peak || Spacewatch || — || align=right | 1.1 km || 
|-id=941 bgcolor=#E9E9E9
| 268941 ||  || — || February 17, 2007 || Kitt Peak || Spacewatch || — || align=right | 1.2 km || 
|-id=942 bgcolor=#E9E9E9
| 268942 ||  || — || February 17, 2007 || Kitt Peak || Spacewatch || — || align=right | 2.3 km || 
|-id=943 bgcolor=#E9E9E9
| 268943 ||  || — || February 17, 2007 || Kitt Peak || Spacewatch || — || align=right | 1.0 km || 
|-id=944 bgcolor=#E9E9E9
| 268944 ||  || — || February 17, 2007 || Kitt Peak || Spacewatch || — || align=right data-sort-value="0.76" | 760 m || 
|-id=945 bgcolor=#E9E9E9
| 268945 ||  || — || February 17, 2007 || Mount Lemmon || Mount Lemmon Survey || — || align=right | 1.3 km || 
|-id=946 bgcolor=#fefefe
| 268946 ||  || — || February 17, 2007 || Palomar || NEAT || NYS || align=right data-sort-value="0.90" | 900 m || 
|-id=947 bgcolor=#E9E9E9
| 268947 ||  || — || February 17, 2007 || Catalina || CSS || — || align=right | 2.3 km || 
|-id=948 bgcolor=#fefefe
| 268948 ||  || — || February 21, 2007 || Mount Lemmon || Mount Lemmon Survey || — || align=right data-sort-value="0.90" | 900 m || 
|-id=949 bgcolor=#fefefe
| 268949 ||  || — || February 16, 2007 || Palomar || NEAT || MAS || align=right data-sort-value="0.96" | 960 m || 
|-id=950 bgcolor=#E9E9E9
| 268950 ||  || — || February 17, 2007 || Catalina || CSS || RAF || align=right | 1.0 km || 
|-id=951 bgcolor=#E9E9E9
| 268951 ||  || — || February 19, 2007 || Mount Lemmon || Mount Lemmon Survey || — || align=right | 1.3 km || 
|-id=952 bgcolor=#fefefe
| 268952 ||  || — || February 21, 2007 || Socorro || LINEAR || — || align=right | 1.1 km || 
|-id=953 bgcolor=#E9E9E9
| 268953 ||  || — || February 21, 2007 || Mount Lemmon || Mount Lemmon Survey || — || align=right | 1.9 km || 
|-id=954 bgcolor=#fefefe
| 268954 ||  || — || February 22, 2007 || Anderson Mesa || LONEOS || V || align=right data-sort-value="0.93" | 930 m || 
|-id=955 bgcolor=#E9E9E9
| 268955 ||  || — || February 22, 2007 || Socorro || LINEAR || — || align=right | 1.1 km || 
|-id=956 bgcolor=#E9E9E9
| 268956 ||  || — || February 23, 2007 || Kitt Peak || Spacewatch || — || align=right | 1.8 km || 
|-id=957 bgcolor=#fefefe
| 268957 ||  || — || February 23, 2007 || Kitt Peak || Spacewatch || — || align=right | 1.3 km || 
|-id=958 bgcolor=#fefefe
| 268958 ||  || — || February 25, 2007 || Mount Lemmon || Mount Lemmon Survey || NYS || align=right data-sort-value="0.81" | 810 m || 
|-id=959 bgcolor=#E9E9E9
| 268959 ||  || — || February 25, 2007 || Mount Lemmon || Mount Lemmon Survey || — || align=right | 1.4 km || 
|-id=960 bgcolor=#E9E9E9
| 268960 ||  || — || February 20, 2007 || Lulin Observatory || LUSS || — || align=right | 1.2 km || 
|-id=961 bgcolor=#E9E9E9
| 268961 ||  || — || February 17, 2007 || Mount Lemmon || Mount Lemmon Survey || MIS || align=right | 3.2 km || 
|-id=962 bgcolor=#E9E9E9
| 268962 ||  || — || March 9, 2007 || Mount Lemmon || Mount Lemmon Survey || — || align=right | 1.00 km || 
|-id=963 bgcolor=#E9E9E9
| 268963 ||  || — || March 9, 2007 || Nashville || R. Clingan || — || align=right | 1.1 km || 
|-id=964 bgcolor=#fefefe
| 268964 ||  || — || March 9, 2007 || Mount Lemmon || Mount Lemmon Survey || SUL || align=right | 2.4 km || 
|-id=965 bgcolor=#E9E9E9
| 268965 ||  || — || March 9, 2007 || Mount Lemmon || Mount Lemmon Survey || — || align=right | 1.8 km || 
|-id=966 bgcolor=#E9E9E9
| 268966 ||  || — || March 9, 2007 || Kitt Peak || Spacewatch || NEM || align=right | 2.9 km || 
|-id=967 bgcolor=#E9E9E9
| 268967 ||  || — || March 10, 2007 || Kitt Peak || Spacewatch || — || align=right | 1.1 km || 
|-id=968 bgcolor=#fefefe
| 268968 ||  || — || March 10, 2007 || Mount Lemmon || Mount Lemmon Survey || — || align=right | 1.1 km || 
|-id=969 bgcolor=#E9E9E9
| 268969 ||  || — || March 10, 2007 || Mount Lemmon || Mount Lemmon Survey || ADE || align=right | 3.1 km || 
|-id=970 bgcolor=#d6d6d6
| 268970 ||  || — || March 10, 2007 || Mount Lemmon || Mount Lemmon Survey || EOS || align=right | 3.2 km || 
|-id=971 bgcolor=#E9E9E9
| 268971 ||  || — || March 31, 2003 || Kitt Peak || Spacewatch || — || align=right | 1.6 km || 
|-id=972 bgcolor=#E9E9E9
| 268972 ||  || — || March 10, 2007 || Kitt Peak || Spacewatch || RAF || align=right | 1.1 km || 
|-id=973 bgcolor=#E9E9E9
| 268973 ||  || — || March 10, 2007 || Kitt Peak || Spacewatch || MIS || align=right | 2.5 km || 
|-id=974 bgcolor=#E9E9E9
| 268974 ||  || — || March 9, 2007 || Kitt Peak || Spacewatch || — || align=right | 1.8 km || 
|-id=975 bgcolor=#E9E9E9
| 268975 ||  || — || March 9, 2007 || Kitt Peak || Spacewatch || — || align=right | 2.0 km || 
|-id=976 bgcolor=#E9E9E9
| 268976 ||  || — || March 9, 2007 || Kitt Peak || Spacewatch || KAZ || align=right | 1.9 km || 
|-id=977 bgcolor=#E9E9E9
| 268977 ||  || — || March 11, 2007 || Catalina || CSS || — || align=right | 1.1 km || 
|-id=978 bgcolor=#E9E9E9
| 268978 ||  || — || March 11, 2007 || Mount Lemmon || Mount Lemmon Survey || — || align=right | 3.5 km || 
|-id=979 bgcolor=#E9E9E9
| 268979 ||  || — || March 11, 2007 || Mount Lemmon || Mount Lemmon Survey || — || align=right | 1.9 km || 
|-id=980 bgcolor=#E9E9E9
| 268980 ||  || — || March 10, 2007 || Kitt Peak || Spacewatch || — || align=right | 1.7 km || 
|-id=981 bgcolor=#E9E9E9
| 268981 ||  || — || March 10, 2007 || Kitt Peak || Spacewatch || — || align=right | 2.6 km || 
|-id=982 bgcolor=#E9E9E9
| 268982 ||  || — || March 10, 2007 || Kitt Peak || Spacewatch || — || align=right | 1.7 km || 
|-id=983 bgcolor=#E9E9E9
| 268983 ||  || — || March 10, 2007 || Kitt Peak || Spacewatch || RAF || align=right | 1.2 km || 
|-id=984 bgcolor=#E9E9E9
| 268984 ||  || — || March 10, 2007 || Palomar || NEAT || ADE || align=right | 3.0 km || 
|-id=985 bgcolor=#E9E9E9
| 268985 ||  || — || March 10, 2007 || Mount Lemmon || Mount Lemmon Survey || — || align=right | 2.0 km || 
|-id=986 bgcolor=#E9E9E9
| 268986 ||  || — || March 12, 2007 || Kitt Peak || Spacewatch || — || align=right | 3.0 km || 
|-id=987 bgcolor=#E9E9E9
| 268987 ||  || — || March 13, 2007 || Mount Lemmon || Mount Lemmon Survey || — || align=right | 2.1 km || 
|-id=988 bgcolor=#E9E9E9
| 268988 ||  || — || March 9, 2007 || Kitt Peak || Spacewatch || — || align=right | 1.1 km || 
|-id=989 bgcolor=#E9E9E9
| 268989 ||  || — || March 9, 2007 || Mount Lemmon || Mount Lemmon Survey || — || align=right data-sort-value="0.84" | 840 m || 
|-id=990 bgcolor=#E9E9E9
| 268990 ||  || — || March 9, 2007 || Catalina || CSS || — || align=right | 1.6 km || 
|-id=991 bgcolor=#E9E9E9
| 268991 ||  || — || April 7, 2003 || Kitt Peak || Spacewatch || — || align=right | 3.9 km || 
|-id=992 bgcolor=#E9E9E9
| 268992 ||  || — || March 11, 2007 || Kitt Peak || Spacewatch || — || align=right | 1.8 km || 
|-id=993 bgcolor=#E9E9E9
| 268993 ||  || — || March 11, 2007 || Kitt Peak || Spacewatch || — || align=right | 1.0 km || 
|-id=994 bgcolor=#E9E9E9
| 268994 ||  || — || March 11, 2007 || Kitt Peak || Spacewatch || — || align=right | 1.7 km || 
|-id=995 bgcolor=#E9E9E9
| 268995 ||  || — || March 11, 2007 || Kitt Peak || Spacewatch || CLO || align=right | 3.2 km || 
|-id=996 bgcolor=#E9E9E9
| 268996 ||  || — || March 11, 2007 || Mount Lemmon || Mount Lemmon Survey || — || align=right | 1.4 km || 
|-id=997 bgcolor=#E9E9E9
| 268997 ||  || — || March 11, 2007 || Mount Lemmon || Mount Lemmon Survey || — || align=right | 1.7 km || 
|-id=998 bgcolor=#E9E9E9
| 268998 ||  || — || March 11, 2007 || Kitt Peak || Spacewatch || MIS || align=right | 3.9 km || 
|-id=999 bgcolor=#E9E9E9
| 268999 ||  || — || March 11, 2007 || Kitt Peak || Spacewatch || — || align=right | 1.3 km || 
|-id=000 bgcolor=#fefefe
| 269000 ||  || — || March 12, 2007 || Kitt Peak || Spacewatch || — || align=right | 1.2 km || 
|}

References

External links 
 Discovery Circumstances: Numbered Minor Planets (265001)–(270000) (IAU Minor Planet Center)

0268